= List of Fijians =

Lists of Fijians

Main list

Politicians

List of Fijian politicians
Heads of state
Viti premiers
Presidents - Vice-presidents
Governors - Governors-general
Prime ministers - Cabinet ministers
Attorneys-general - Foreign ministers
iTaukei (Fijian) affairs ministers - GCC chairmen
Opposition leaders
House speakers - Senate presidents
Parliamentarians - Senators

Other community leaders:
List of Fijian sportspeople

This list comprises Fijian citizens, and some foreigners associated with Fiji. For the sake of size, persons who could be listed under multiple categories should generally be listed only under the category for which they are best known.

The term Fijian is used here in a national rather than an ethnic sense.

== Academic leaders ==
- Chandra, Rajesh, Vice-Chancellor of the University of Fiji
- Lal, Brij, historian
- Narayan, Paresh, Fiji-born Australian academic
- Pillay, Sarojini, Registrar of the University of Fiji
- Rudrananda, Swami, founder of the Then India Sanmarga Ikya Sangam
- Siwatibau, Savenaca, academic leader; Vice-Chancellor of the University of the South Pacific

== Activists ==
- Ali, Shamima, political activist and women's rights campaigner
- Bhagwan-Rolls, Sharon, political activist and women's rights campaigner
- Heffernan, Angie, political activist
- Luveni, Jiko, dentist and AIDS campaigner; Speaker of the Parliament of Fiji since 2014
- Singh, Anirudh, opposed the imposition of the 1990 Constitution
- Siwatibau, Suliana, political activist

== Business people ==
- Iqbal, Imraz, political activist, businessman, former journalist
- Khan, Ballu, business tycoon (now deceased)
- Nagindas, Shivlal, Labasa businessman and former Senator
- Nawalowalo, Ratu Josateki, businessman and Chairman of the Kadavu Provincial Council
- Niranjan, Sangeeta, businesswoman
- Punja, Hari (born 1937), business tycoon
- Samisoni, Adi Mere, businesswoman and Member of Parliament
- Seeto, Dixon, business tycoon and president of the Chinese Association of Fiji
- Singh, Ram, Indian-born businessman
- Toganivalu, Davila, businesswoman and newspaper publisher
- Waradi, Taito, President of the Fiji Chamber of Commerce and Industry

== Chiefs ==
Chiefs, excluding chiefs listed in other sections, include:

- Ratu Kuliniyasi Roko Malani, father of Ratu Wilisoni Tuiketei Malani, chief, elder lineage Gonesau of Vueti, 1st Roko Tui Bau, Tui Viti.
- Cakobau, Ratu Epenisa, Bauan chief
- Kanakana, Ratu Epeli, Fijian chief (Tui Suva)
- Katonivere, Ratu Aisea, Tui Macuata (paramount chief of Macuata)
- Kadavulevu, Ratu Penaia, Vunivalu of Bau (1901–1914)
- Madraiwiwi, Ratu Joni (the First), chief (1859–1920)
- Nailatikau, Ratu Epeli (the First) (1842–1901), Vunivalu of Bau
- Niumataiwalu, founder of the Vuanirewa dynasty in the Lau Islands
- Rasolo, first Tui Nayau
- Rokocegu, Maculeku, Tui Dreketi
- Rokomatu, Adi Joana, Tui Sigatoka
- Sovasova, Ratu Jovesa, Tui Vitogo (1942–2005)
- Tupou, Ratu Taliai, Tui Nayau (d. 1875)
- Tarau of Tovu Totoya, Fijian chieftainess
- Udre Udre, Ratu, 19th century cannibal
- Ulugalala, Alifereti Finau, Tui Nayau (d. 1934)
- Visawaqa, Ratu Tanoa, Vunivalu of Bau (1800s)
- Uluilakeba I, successor to Rasolo (q.v.) as Tui Nayau, but not so installed

== Civil servants ==
- Acraman, Rodney, former ombudsman and chairman of the Fiji Human Rights Commission
- Bainimarama, Meli, CEO of Fijian Affairs Board (December 2006-January 2007; subsequently reemployed as an advisor to the board)
- Browne, Joseph
- Hatch, Hector, former chairman of the Public Service Commission
- Huggett, Stuart, former chairman of the Public Service Commission
- Jale, Anare, chief executive officer of the Public Service Commission; former ambassador to the United States
- Korovavala, Lesi, chief executive officer of the Home Affairs Ministry
- Kotobalavu, Joji, chief executive officer of the Prime Minister's Department
- Naupoto, Viliame, former Navy commander; former director of immigration from January 2007; now the current Minister for Youth and Sports
- Qionibaravi, Adi Litia, chief executive officer of the Fijian Affairs Board
- Ram, Rishi, chairman of the Public Service Commission and former ambassador to Japan
- Ridgeway, Peter, former deputy director of prosecutions
- Shameem, Shaista, director of the Fiji Human Rights Commission
- Tuisolia, Ratu Sakiusa, former chief executive officer of Airports Fiji Limited
- Vakalalabure, Ratu Rakuita, deputy speaker of the House, member of House of Representatives of Fiji
- Vakalalabure, Ratu Tevita, senator, president of the Senate, member of the Great Council of Chiefs, member of House of Representatives, Vunivalu of Natewa

== Entertainment and media ==
- Derek Boyer, "The Island Warrior", actor
- Mike Howlett, musician
- Cassius Khan, classical tabla and ghazal player now based in Vancouver, British Columbia, Canada
- Talei Burns, vocalist, musician
- Malumu ni Tobu kei Naivaukura, musician
- Lagani Rabukawaqa, musician
- Rebecca Singh, television news presenter, now based in New Zealand
- Kula Kei Uluivuya, musician
- Laisa Vulakoro, singer
- Savuto Vakadewavosa, singer
- Elena Baravilala, singer

== Diplomats ==
- Bune, Poseci, diplomat and politician
- Konrote, George, diplomat and politician; Rotuman
- Nailatikau, Ratu Epeli, President of Fiji (since 2009) and former High Commissioner to the United Kingdom, Parliamentary Speaker, and Cabinet Minister
- Nandan, Satya, Secretary-General of the International Seabed Authority (1996–present)
- Savua, Isikia, diplomat and former Police Commissioner
- Tavola, Kaliopate, Minister for Foreign Affairs (2000–2006) and former Ambassador to Belgium
- Vitusagavulu, Jesoni, businessman and diplomat, Ambassador to Washington (2005)
- Waqanisau, Jeremaia, career soldier and diplomat; Ambassador to China

== Legal ==
- Fatiaki, Daniel, Chief Justice (2002–2007)
- Gates, Anthony, Chief Justice (since 2007)
- Kepa, Sailosi, judge, diplomat, cabinet minister, ombudsman (1938–2004)
- Matanitobua, Naomi, Chief Magistrate
- Mishra, Ghananand, jurist (1916–2005)
- Naqiolevu, Sekove, judge
- Shameem, Nazhat, judge
- Singh, Ajit Swaran, Fiji-born New Zealand judge
- Tuivaga, Sir Timoci, Chief Justice (1974–2002)

== Military leaders ==
- Bainimarama, Voreqe (Frank), military commander and interim Head of State (2000; 2006–2007); interim prime minister of Fiji (2007–2014), Prime Minister since 2014. Leader of the 2006 Fijian coup d'état.
- Baledrokadroka, Ratu Jone, Lieutenant Colonel and former Acting Land Force Commander
- Driti, Pita, Land Force Commander (as of early 2007)
- Kean, Francis, Navy Commander (as of early 2007)
- Leweni, Neumi, Army spokesman
- Mara, Ratu Tevita, Army Major; former Army Chief of Staff (as of 2006)
- Naupoto, Viliame, former Navy commander; Director of Immigration (as of early 2007)
- Rabuka, Sitiveni, 1987 coup leader, later prime minister (1992–1999)
- Rabukawaqa, Orisi, Army spokesman
- Saubulinayau, Meli, senior Army officer
- Seruvakula, Viliame, Army officer, who led the counteroffensive against the mutiny at Queen Elizabeth Barracks on 2 November 2000
- Sukanaivalu, Sefanaia, war hero (Second World War)
- Teleni, Esala, Naval Captain and former Deputy Commander of the Republic of Fiji Military Forces
- Waqanisau, Jeremia, career soldier and diplomat; Ambassador to China
- Humphrey Tawake, Captain and Chief Naval Officer
- Semi Koroilavesau, rose to the rank of Commander, prior to running for elected office
- Netani Sukanaivalu, rose to the rank of Lieutenant Commander, prior to running for elected office

== Police officers ==
- Bulamainaivalu, Kevueli, assistant commissioner of police - crime
- Driver, Moses, deputy commissioner of police
- Hughes, Andrew, commissioner of police
- Khan, Jahir, senior superintendent of police
- Koroi, Jimi, acting commissioner of police (2006–2007)
- Ridgeway, Peter, former deputy director of prosecutions
- Tikotikoca, Romanu, commissioner of police

== Religious leaders ==
- Bryce, Jabez, Anglican Bishop
- Chambers, Amy, Anglican priest
- Dudley, Hannah, Methodist missionary
- Kuppuswami, Sadhu, Hindu religious leader (1890–1956)
- Kurulo, Suliasi, head of the Fiji- based Christian Mission Fellowship
- Kush, Kundan Singh, Arya Samaj missionary
- Mataca, Petero, Roman Catholic Archbishop of Fiji
- Qiliho, Apimeleki, first indigenous Fijian Anglican Bishop
- Sharma, Gabriel, first Indo-Fijian Anglican Bishop
- Sharma, Shri Krishna, Arya Samaj (Hindu) religious leader
- Sing, Sakiusa, Roman Catholic priest and educator (1946–2005)
- Yabaki, Akuila, clergyman and human rights activist

== Unionists ==
- Anthony, Felix, FTUC General Secretary
- Chandra, Baba Ram, India-born trade unionist
- Muni, Vashist, labour union organizer
- Naivaluwaqa, Timoci, trade unionist (1953–2006)
- Prasad, Ayodhya, founder of Kisan Sangh
- Rae, Pramod, labour union organizer and National Federation Party Secretary
- Sami, Jagannath, labour union organizer; suspended in late 2006 as chief executive officer of the Sugar Cane Growers Council
- Sanadhya, Totaram, labour union organizer
- Singh, Attar, FITCU General Secretary
- Singh, Mehar, founder of the Vishal Sangh
- Singh, Nirbhay, CPSU official

== Miscellaneous ==
Fijian public figures who do not fit into one of the more other categories include:

- Navakasuasua, Maciu, 2000 coup plotter
- Waqabaca, Josaia, former NVTLP activist turned coup-plot informer
- Wali, Miki, activist for democracy, transgender rights and the impact of climate change

== Non-resident Fiji Islanders ==
Fiji Islanders who are living abroad, or who have been naturalised as citizens of other countries, or who were born abroad but have Fijian roots, include:

- Boyer, Derek, born in Lautoka, Fiji; acted in DOA: Dead or Alive released in 2006
- Butler, Trevor, winner of Big Brother Australia 2004
- Curuenavuli, Paulini, Australian-based singer and former member of the band Young Divas; born in Suva, Fiji
- Khan, Cassius, Canada, Indian classical musician; born in Lautoka
- Lal, Prerna, American writer and attorney; Fiji-born, Indian descent
- Mishra, Sudesh, Australian poet; Fiji-born, Indian descent
- Narayan, Justin, winner of the thirteenth series of MasterChef Australia; born in Australia to Fiji-born parents of Indian origin
- Parker, Craig, New Zealand-based actor born in Suva, Fiji; acted in The Lord of the Rings: The Two Towers
- Satyanand, Anand, Governor-General of New Zealand; born in New Zealand to Fiji-born parents of Indian origin
- Singh, Bobby, Canadian football player; born in Suva
- Singh, Jason, Australian-born singer; Fiji Indian father
