= Soroaqali =

Toki Soroaqali was a Lauan chief and member of the noble dynasty of Vuanirewa in Fiji, active in the late 1700s and early 1800s.

He was the second son of Rasolo, the first Tui Nayau through a lady of rank from the Narewadamu. He was thus half brother to both, the second and third Tui Nayau's, Malani and Taliai Tupou.

As his mother belonged to the Narewadamu, the original noble houses of Lakeba, he was considered Vasu i Taukei, having greater rights in Lakeba through his mother. Prior to Malani becoming Roko Sau, he and his younger brother Taliai Tupou, whose mothers were from outside Lakeba, offered him the right to become Roko Sau and Tui Nayau. He opted out stating that should he become High Chief, the Lakeba people would not listen to them as they had no kinsfolk amongst them but should Malani take the chieftainship and require anything, he would direct the Lakeba people to follow his brother's orders as they were his kin. It was thus that Malani succeeded to Roko Sau and Tui Nayau without further dispute.

Further records show that Soroaqali was alive when the first missionaries arrived on Lakeba. He however despised the new religion and opposed Christianity to the end. He died in 1844.
