= Radini Nayau =

Title given to the wife or chief wife of the Paramount Chief of the Lau Islands in Fiji

Radini Nayau is the courtesy title given to the wife or chief wife of the Tu'i Nayau, Chief of the Lau Islands in Fiji. The bearer of title is installed at the same time as the Tui Nayau. In the past when polygamy was the norm and the Tui Nayau had many wives, the chief or senior wife bore this title.

The first holder of the title is likely to have been Laufitu, the senior wife of Rasolo, the first installed Tui Nayau. The last holder of this title was Ro Lady Lala Mara.

The following table lists consorts of Tui Nayaus who have held the title.

Order		Consort of	Lived	Notes
1.	Laufitu	Rasolo	17??-17??	Daughter of the High Chief of Totoya
2.	Ciri of Taqalevu	Malani	17??-18??	Lady of Tubou
3.	Adi Qativi	Taliai Tupou	18??-18??	Daughter of Paramount Chief of Cakaudrove
4.	Tiu of Taqalevu	Eroni Loganimoce	18??-18??	Lady of Tubou
5.	Ateca Mocewai	Alifereti Finau Ulugalala	18??-19??	Granddaughter of Ratu Seru Cakobau, Vunivalu of Bau
6.	Roko Senivaivai	Tevita Uluilakeba III	18??-19??	Lady of Mataqali Naivi, Tubou
7.	Lala Mara	Ratu Sir Kamisese Kapaiwai Tuimacilai Mara	1931-2004	Daughter of Roko Tui Dreketi
