= Kalouyalewa =

Fijian chief

- Spouse(s): Sivoki; Tagiamarama
- Issue: Delaivugalei; Tongatapu; Qoma
- Father: Naosara

Kalouyalewa (pronounced [kaloujaleɰa]) (born on Nayau) was a Fijian High Chief.

Kalouyalewa was a son of the Chief Naosara (Tuivanuakula II) and his wife, Adi Gelegeleavanua, and thus a grandson of Chief Kubunavanua II, who was very famous.

He was born on the island of Nayau. His elder brother was named Buivaroro. Their sister was Chiefess Keletu.

Kalouyalewa went on the island of Lakeba, where he married into the island’s principal chiefly families. His first wife was named Sivoki. She was a member of Cekena, the dynasty then holding the title Sau. They had two sons, Delaivugalei and Tongatapu.

Second wife of Kalouyalewa was Chiefess Tagiamarama, who bore him a son called Qoma.

Kalouyalewa’s sons would eventually play a crucial role in enabling the Vuanirewa Dynasty to succeed to the titles Roko Sau and Tui Nayau.

His famous grandson was High Chief Delailoa of Lakeba.

Delaivugalei in his adult years married Adi Vulase.

== Family tree ==
Family tree of Kalouyalewa

Chief Naosara of Nayau
Chief Kalouyalewa
Adi Gelegeleavanua of Nayau
Chief Qoma
Chiefess Tagiamarama
High Chief Delailoa of Lakeba
Wife of Qoma
Chiefess Vakadewa
Wife of Delailoa
