= Delailoa =

Fijian chief

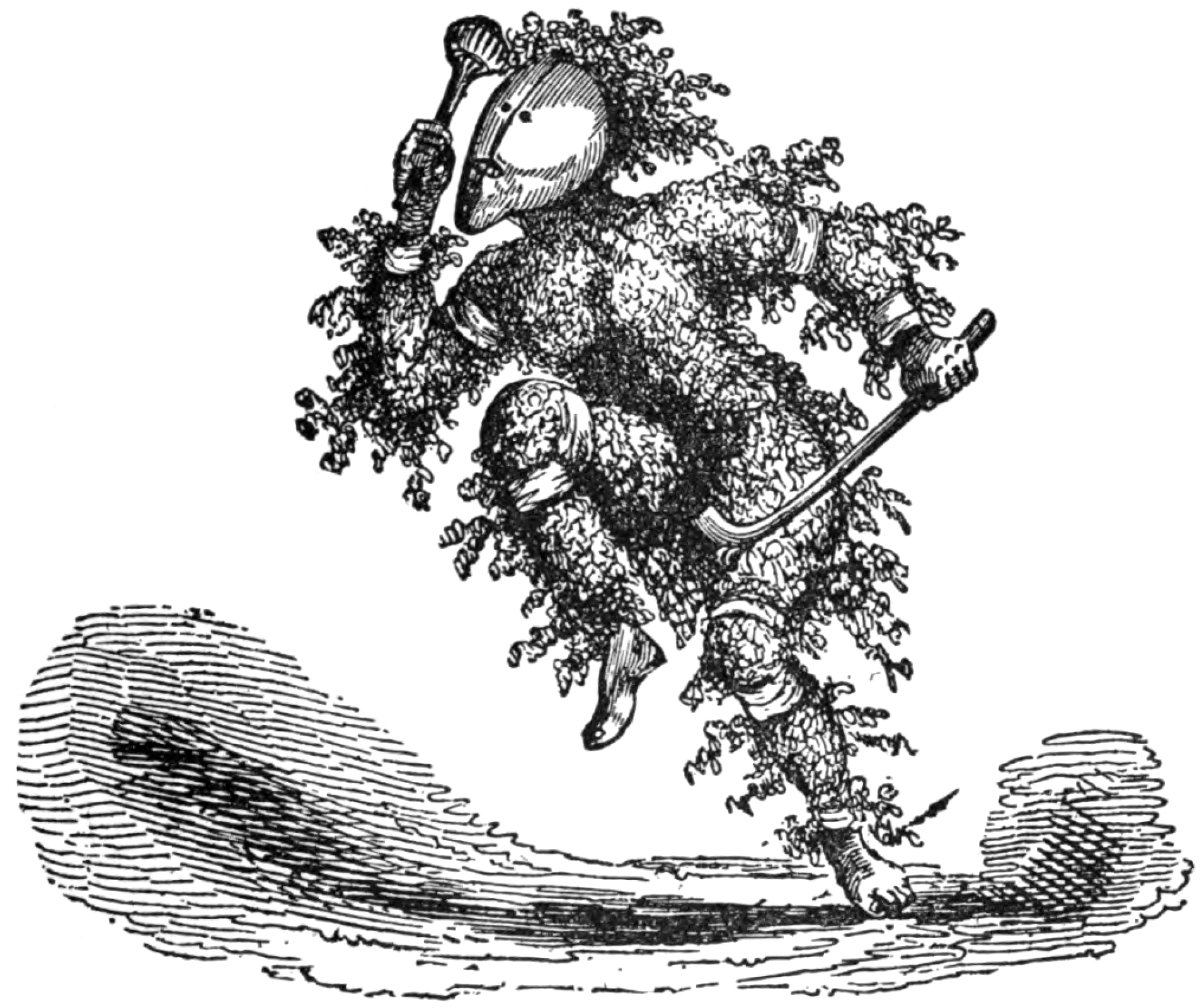
- Born: Lakeba, Fiji
- Spouse(s): Unknown
- Issue: Lokininayau; Vakadewa; Uluinayau
- Parents: Qoma and his wife

Delailoa (born on Lakeba) was a Fijian High Chief.

He had an instrumental role in maintaining the fortunes of the Vuanirewa under the reign of his relative Malani.

== Family ==
Delailoa was a son of the Chief Qoma and grandson of Chief Kalouyalewa and his wife Tagiamarama. Mother of Delailoa was a wife of Qoma.

Delailoa's lineage relocated and remained on the island of Nayau. Delailoa's descendants still live on Nayau. His relative was Malani.

Delailoa's spouse is not known, but he had two sons – Lokininayau and Uluinayau, and one daughter – Vakadewa.

One son of Delailoa warned Malani of Chief Dranivia's impending plans.

== Biography ==
Chief Niumataiwalu killed his uncle Qoma and tried to kill Delailoa, who survived in this way – he was saved when his mother's people from Waciwaci in Lakeba, hid him from Niumataiwalu.

Delailoa would later be welcomed back by Niumataiwalu after Niumataiwalu realised that upon his impending death by the Bauans after impregnating the Radini Levuka in Bau, that Delailoa would be his only surviving close relative. He would then welcome Delailoa back, and would ask Delailoa to return to Nayau and to protect his name. Delailoa would then conquer all of Nayau (see works by Hocart) and become its overall leader until Rasolo and his brother Matawalu would seek refuge there and later where Rasolo be installed as Tui Nayau.

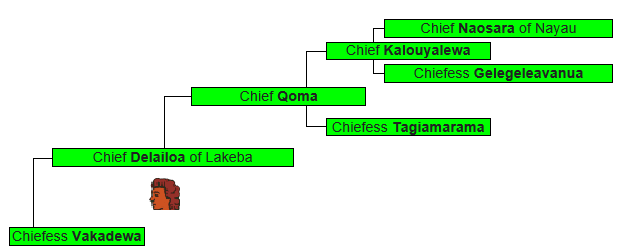

Delailoa could not claim this title since it had been transferred to Niumataiwalu's lineage in Lakeba that would be consolidated by the installation of Rasolo.

== See also ==
- List of Fijians
