= Laufitu =

Fijian chiefess

- Radini Nayau
- Consort: Rasolo
- Issue: Roko Malani
- Father: Chief of Totoya
- Mother: Chiefess of Vavaʻu

Laufitu was a Fijian chiefess.

== Family ==
Laufitu was the first wife of Rasolo, who was the third Sau kei Lau of the Lau Islands and first Tu'i Nayau. They were the parents of Roko Malani, the seventh Sau kei Lau.

Laufitu would have been the first to hold the title of and to be correctly referred to as Radini Nayau.

Laufitu was a daughter of the Chief of Totoya and a woman of Vavaʻu. Laufitu and her younger sister Radavu were sent as wives for Rasolo. It is from Laufitu that the noble household of Matailakeba claims descent.
