= I. L. Bula =

Fijian cricketer

Personal information
- Born: 15 November 1921; Tubou, Fiji
- Batting: Right-handed
- Role: Batsman

Domestic team information
- Years: Team
- 1947/48–1953/54: Fiji
- First-class debut: 13 February 1948 Fiji v Auckland
- Last First-class: 12 January 1956 Fiji v West Indians

Career statistics
Competition	First-class
Matches	9
Runs scored	702
Batting average	41.29
100s/50s	2/3
Top score	120
Catches/stumpings	8/–
- Source: Cricinfo, 21 March 2019

Ilikena Lasarusa Talebulamainavaleniveivakabulaimainakulalakebalau (born 15 November 1921, date of death unknown) was a Fijian cricketer who played nine first-class matches for Fiji between 1947–48 and 1953–54. He was more commonly known by the shortened version of his name, I. L. Bula, derived from his initials and the third and fourth syllable of his name – his official surname is, however, the longest of any man who has played first-class cricket. His name literally means "returned alive from Nankula hospital at Lakeba island in the Lau group", and is regarded as the second longest word in the Fijian language.

As Fiji was not a Test nation during his time, his first-class matches were limited to two tours of New Zealand. Bula was a hard hitter of the ball, and was said to have scored a century in an hour against Canterbury on his second tour in 1953–54. He also hit 22 sixes in a club match at Suva in 1958 in which he scored 246, the highest total in domestic Fijian cricket. In 2005, Bula became the first cricketer inducted into Fiji's Hall of Fame.

== First New Zealand tour ==
Bula made his first-class debut at the age of 26 against Auckland in February 1948, batting at number three and top-scoring with 44 before he was caught off part-time bowler Verdun Scott. He shared an 80-run partnership with George Cakobau as Fiji moved to 98 for 3, but they were quickly bowled out for 143, trailing Auckland by 197. Auckland opted to bat again instead of enforcing the follow on, and added 154 before declaring, which left Fiji to chase 332 for the victory. Bula once again made it into double figures, but was bowled by spinner Francis Hemmingson, and Fiji lost by 168 runs.

The next match became Fiji's first first-class victory on tour, against Wellington, and Bula's efforts were one of the keys to the victory. Fiji had taken a 47-run lead on first innings, despite Bula scoring 1 – one of only two single-figure scores in his career. Three Wellington batsmen hit half-centuries, however, leaving Fiji 247 for the victory in a little less than a day – and after losing opener Patrick Raddock for 0, it looked difficult. Bula added 88, however, lifting Fiji to 161 for 2 before they lost three wickets for no run. However, 25 from Maurice Fenn took them over the line.

The third match, against Canterbury, saw Bula hit a career highest score – in a high-scoring match, 1224 runs were hit in three days, and Bula made 183 of those, split over two innings. Fiji were set a target of 354 to win after Canterbury had amassed 421/9d and 209/8d in their two innings, and Bula hit 120 as Fiji set about chasing that target – however, three wickets from Jack Booker set them back, and they lost by 36 runs. A loss against Otago followed, where Bula made insignificant scores, before a full-strength Auckland team were defeated by 115 runs in a good come-back – Fiji had trailed by 52 runs on first innings after Auckland declared on 181 for 8, but Bula and Harry Apted added 135 for the second wicket as Fiji posted 351/7. Set 300 to win, Auckland were bowled out by Fenn (6–94) and Isoa Logavatu (4–46).

== Second New Zealand tour ==
Fiji returned for four games in the New Zealand summer of 1954, but only won one. The first game, against Otago, went down to the wire as Otago eked out a two-wicket win despite a second-innings five-for from Fenn, but it was a personal disappointment for Bula, who only managed 5 and 26 in his two innings. Then came the one-hour century against Canterbury with eight sixes and five fours, as Fiji plundered 344 from 65.3 overs in the second innings to set Canterbury a challenging 217 – which they managed for the loss of eight wickets. This was Bula's last century, and indeed his last score above 30 – as he was pushed down the order to No. 6 against Wellington, he made 23 and 26, but Wellington still forced a 117-run win, before Bula rounded off his first-class career with a seven-wicket win over Auckland – in a match that was shortened from three days to one due to rain. However, a two-innings game was still played, as the first three innings were all declared closed. Fiji were set 79 to win in a relatively short time, but after falling to 51 for 3 Bula hit 23 not out to guide Fiji to their fourth – and so far last – first class victory.

== Personal life ==
Bula came from the chiefly village Tubou, Lakeba, in the Lau Islands and was the great great-grand nephew of the Tongan prince and conqueror, Enele Ma'afu. He worked as a clerk in the Native Lands Commission in Fiji.

In September 2005, it was announced that Bula would be posthumously inducted into the Fiji Sports Hall of Fame. The Fiji Times have also noted that Bula is deceased.
