= Rasolo =

Chief Rasolo of Nayau Tu'i Nayau Rasolo
- Wives: Laufitu; Radavu
- Issue: Roko Malani; Soroaqali; Taliai Tupou
- Father: Niumataiwalu
- Mother: Tarau of Totoya

Rasolo was a Fijian High Chief.

== Family ==
Father of Rasolo was Chief Niumataiwalu of Lakeba. Rasolo's mother was Lady Tarau of Totoya. Rasolo was a brother of Lady Sivoki and Uluilakeba I and half-brother of Matawalu.

Rasolo's first wife was Lady Laufitu. Their son was Roko Malani.

Rasolo's second wife was from Lakeba. She bore Soroaqali to Rasolo. Lady Radavu was the third wife of Rasolo, and was the mother of Taliai Tupou.

== Biography ==
Rasolo became the third Roko Sau of the Lau Islands and first installed holder of the title Tu'i Nayau. According to the oral history, Rasolo was exiled to Nayau.

He is considered to be the progenitor of the noble households Matailakeba and Vatuwaqa.

It was under the rule of Rasolo that the invading Bauan forces were driven from Lakeba.
