= Meli Saubulinayau =

Fijian soldier

Colonel Ratu Meli Saubulinayau is a former Fijian career soldier, who, as of January 2006, headed the Strategic Unit in Suva. He was appointed to the post at the beginning of January 2006. Previously the Acting Land Force Commander, he had been effectively the second in rank to Commodore Frank Bainimarama, the Commander Republic of Fiji Military Forces, and it was rumoured that he had been removed from this post because of differences with the Commander, but Military spokesman Captain Neumi Leweni denied this on 13 January 2006, according to the Fiji Times.

The previous day, the Fiji Live news service reported that Saubulinayau had been called in to mediate between Bainimarama and the new Acting Land Force Commander, Lieutenant Colonel Jone Baledrokadroka, but Leweni and Bainimarama both denied that the confrontation, alleged to be over Bainimarama's anti-government rhetoric and threats to depose the government, had taken place. All Military meetings that day had been routine, they insisted.

On 31 October 2006, while Bainimarama was in Egypt visiting Fijian forces on peacekeeping duties in the Middle East, President Ratu Josefa Iloilo accepted government counsel by moving to terminate the Bainimarama's command. In his place, he appointed Saubulinayau, who declined to take the position. Senior Fijian military officers publicly backed Bainimarama who reiterated previous calls for the government to resign. Saubulinayau was subsequently sent on leave pending an investigation into alleged insubordination, in connection with the attempted dismissal of Bainimarama. Saubulinayau's resignation from the military was announced in February, 2007.

Ratu Meli Saubulinayau is from the chiefly village of Tubou, on Lakeba, making him a member of the Vuanirewa, the ruling household of the Lau Islands
