= Tarau of Totoya =

Wife of Niumataiwalu

- Consort: Niumataiwalu
- Issue: Sivoki; Uluilakeba I Rasolo
- Father: Chief of Totoya

Tarau of Totoya was the first wife of Niumataiwalu, founder of the Vuanirewa dynasty of the Lau Islands (in Fiji).

Tarau was the mother of Sivoki, Uluilakeba I and Rasolo.

== Tarau and Niumataiwalu ==
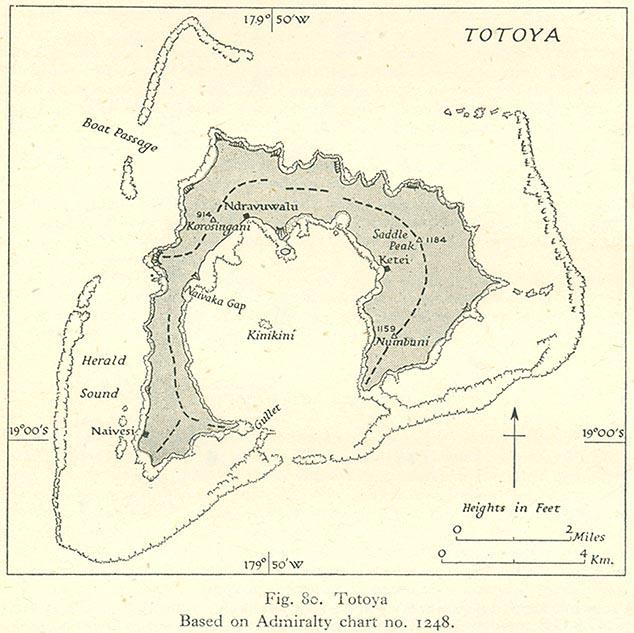
Chart of Totoya

Oral history indicates that Tarau was daughter of the High Chief of Totoya, and because of her beauty, Niumataiwalu pursued for her hand on one of his visits to the island. However it is further recorded that she was not the biological daughter of the Chief of Totoya, but merely adopted by him in order to raise her status to that of a noble and allow Niumataiwalu to marry her. She is said to have been a captive from the island of Komo and was brought up in the Lord of Totoya's household.

When Niumataiwalu became enamoured with Tarau and sued for marriage, the Lord of Totoya instructed him to climb the red coconut palm, harvest the fruit and bathe Tarau with the milk from it to wash away her Komoan nationality and become a Totoyan. When this was done, only then was Tarau recognised as the High Chief of Totoya's daughter.
