= Sivoki =

Eldest child of Niumataiwalu, first Roko Sau and High Chief of the Lau Islands, Fiji

- Issue: Radravu
- Father: Niumataiwalu
- Mother: Tarau of Totoya

Sivoki was the eldest child and only daughter of Niumataiwalu, first Roko Sau and High Chief of the Lau Islands, Fiji. Sivoki's mother was Tarau of Totoya.

Oral history has it that Sivoki was exceedingly beautiful, a trait she most likely inherited from her father and for which she was eventually used for, in strengthening alliances with other noble households. Sivoki was married off at a young age into a noble house from Somosomo, another chiefly village in Cakaudrove, a realm that came under the Tui Cakau. Her husband, Komaibatiniwai, was a renowned warrior during this period and the union from this marriage produced one child, a son, Radravu. As her husband was in his twilight years the marriage ended prematurely resulting with Sivoki and her son’s return to Lakeba, at the request of her brother, Uluilakeba I, had by now succeeded to his father’s title. Her son was raised and adopted into one of the noble households, Vatuwaqa, whilst she herself was eventually married off again to another chief from the island of Vanua Balavu.
