= Tui Nayau =

Fiji paramount chief

Tui Nayau is the title held by the paramount chief of the Lau Islands in Fiji and is synonymous with the title holders over lordship of these islands. When translated, Tui Nayau means "Lord of Nayau", an island north of Lakeba, the latter accepted by many to be the chief island in the Lauan archipelago. Prior to being installed as Tui Nayau, the claimant must first be confirmed upon the decision of the noble households making up the Vuanirewa clan and then installed Sau or High Chief of Lau. Not every Sau has been installed Tui Nayau.

== Origins of the title ==
Tui Nayau was originally an independent title referring specifically to the overlord of Nayau, then separate from the Lakeba State.

The earliest oral records suggest that the progenitor of the leading family of Nayau stemmed from Naosara, celebrated chief who had won the infamous Cici Turaga, but was not accepted by his older brothers and relatives as he was the youngest in that race. Naosara had sons Buivaroro and Kalouyalewa.

== The rise of the Vuanirewa Dynasty ==
The period after the death of Niumataiwalu in Ono-i-Lau can be assumed to have followed with the conquest of Lakeba by the Levuka people from Bau and supplanting the supremacy of the Ceiekena dynasty in the Lakeba State with a dictatorship under the heavy hand of the Levuka peoples’ leader, Codro. Before this occurred, Niumatawalu's surviving sons had fled and sought refuge with their relatives.

It was during this exile on Nayau when Rasolo, Niumataiwalu's son set up his foundations near a rewa (Cerbera manghas) tree. The name Vuanirewa comes into existence. With the passing of Vukinavanua, an ensuing dispute among the nobles over who should succeed him arose. According to oral history, the high priest intervened by taking all claimants to the top towering cliffs called Delaiwawa and indicated that the only one to leap from the cliff and live would be worthy to succeed to the title. It is here that Rasolo enters into the legend, as he is the only one who takes up the challenge, leaps and survives.

Installed as Tui Nayau, Rasolo was approached by the Lakeba people to free them from Codro's tyrannical rule. It is said Rasolo allowed himself to be approached three times before agreeing to their request. He and his brother Matawalu then lead an army with supporting Lakeba forces which routed and expelled Codro and the Levuka people. With this triumph Rasolo was brought over from Nayau and installed as Roko Sau, in which the whole of Lakeba took part.

Rasolo was succeeded by his brother Matawalu. He removed himself to Bau for a long period, allowing for his nephew Dranivia, son of Uluilakeba I to seize power. Matawalu upon hearing this returned to Lakeba, reasserted his authority, whilst his nephew fled to Nayau. This point takes a dramatic and dark turn in the history of the Vuanirewa as Malani, Rasolo's son concerned with the anti-Tongan attitude of his uncle and fear for his mother's people well-being, took the opportunity of Dranivia's expulsion to lead a coup that lead to kin slaying and the death of Matawalu. Matawalu's death again heralded Dranivia's return, but his attempt at taking Lakeba was thwarted, with the support of Malani's Nayau relative Delailoa, on whom he bestowed the name Lagonilakeba in gratitude.

== Succession rules ==
The Vuanirewa unwritten rules on succession tend to follow the following three principles:

- The general custom of passing from elder to younger brother until that generation is extinct, then taking the next generation in the same order through the two households of Matailakeba or Vatuwaqa.
- The tendency to alternate between the two noble households, Matailakeba and Vatuwaqa, with the exclusion of Naivi and Koroicumu
- The tendency to recognize superior nobility of the senior branch of the two households, Matailakeba and Vatuwaqa.

== Tui Nayau Consort ==
When the Tui Nayau is traditionally installed, his wife or in the past his senior wife was likewise installed with him and bore the title Radini Nayau or "Lady of Nayau". The most recent Radini Nayau was the Roko Tui Dreketi, Lady Lala Mara.

The table below lists the individuals who have held the title of Roko Sau.

Order	Name	Reigned	Lived	Notes
1.	Niumataiwalu			Not installed as Tui Nayau
2.	Roko Rasolo			Son of Niumatawalu, first Tui Nayau. Shifted to Lakeba after the Vuanirewa battle at Lakeba (Valu ni Lawa ni Doko) and installed as Sau ni Vanua ko Lau. Founder of the Tokatoka Matailakeba.
3.	RokoMatawalu			Son of Niumatawalu; not installed as Tui Nayau
4.	Roko Malani	17??-1833	17??-1833	Son of Roko Rasolo, not installed as Tui Nayau. Head of the Tokatoka Matailakeba, his descendants remain in the Tokatoka Matailakeba to date.
5.	Roko Taliai Tupou	1833–1875	17??-1875	Son of Roko Rasolo and younger brother of Roko Malani, not installed as Tui Nayau. Founder of the Tokatoka Vatuwaqa.
6.	Ratu Tevita Uluilakeba II	1875–1876	18??-1876	Son of RatuVuetasau, son of Roko Malani; not installed as Tui Nayau. During the reign of Roko Taliai Tupou, the Vuanirewa were commissioned to arrange the marriage of Adi Asenaca Kakua, daughter of Ratu Seru Cakobau, to Ratu Tevita Uluilakeba II. As a wedding gift, Roko Taliai Tupou bestowed upon the couple the house Vatuwaqa for their residence and ownership. The Vuanirewa later renovated the house and renamed it Vatuwaqalevu, to denote that the descendants of Ratu Tevita Uluilakeba II and Adi Asenaca Kakua hold precedence over the Vuanirewa and are destined to lead Lau.
7.	Ratu Eroni C Loganimoce	1876–1898	18??-1898	Son of Roko Taliai Tupou, not installed as Tui Nayau
8.	Ratu Alifereti Finau Ulugalala	1898–1934	18??-1934	Son of Ratu Tevita Uluilakeba II, not installed as Tui Nayau.
9.	Ratu Tevita Uluilakeba III	1934–1966	1898–1966	Son of Ratu Alifereti Finau Uluqalala, officially installed as the second Tui Nayau.
10.	RatuKamisese Kapaiwai Tuimacilai Mara	1969–2004	1920–2004	Son of Ratu Tevita Uluilakeba III, officially installed as the 3rd Tui Nayau.
11.	Ratu Tevita Lutunauga Kapaiwai Uluilakeba Mara	2025–	1965 -	Son of Ratu Kamisese Kapaiwai Tuimacilai Mara Uluilakeba, officially installed as the 4th Tui Nayau.
