= Lakeba State =

The Lakeba State denotes the first Lauan state in what is now Lau Province, Fiji.

It was first controlled by Lakeba. They were then consolidated by the Cei-e-kena Dynasty by the end of the 17th century. This included the following southern Lau Islands:

- Kabara and its dependencies, Vuaqava, Marabo, Tavunasici, Komo, Fiji and Namuka
- Fulaga and its dependencies, Ogea Levu and Ogea Driki
- Ono-i-Lau and its dependency Vatoa
- Oneata
- Moce
