= Vuetasau =

Fijian explorer

Viliame (William) Vuetasau (c.1820-1857) was a Fijian explorer who was the son of Roko Malani, the seventh Roko Sau of Lau and second Tui Nayau and Ciri of Taqalevu. During the reign of his Uncle Taliai Tupou, third Tui Nayau, he was considered heir to the title. He was the first of his noble line to be given a western name, William, after Willam Cary, survivor of the Nantucket whaling ship Oeno that was wrecked in the Lau Islands in 1825. William Cary was rescued by a brother of Malani, who in time became close friends with Malani himself, who named his son after the New Englander, demonstrating his attachment to the shipwrecked sailor.

Vuetasau was instrumental in strengthening the hold of Christianity in Lakeba, and thereafter the rest of Lau. On the arrival of Christian missionaries William Cross and David Cargill on Lakeba in 1835, an announcement of their mission to Taliai Tupou was made and accordingly they were conducted to Matailakeba, his heirs' house, while the purpose of their coming was once again explained. Vuetasau approved and Taliai Tupou in turn followed suit and the missionaries were allowed to stay and establish a church.

Vuetasau never succeeded to his uncles title as he drowned in 1857 whilst in an expedition with Tongan Chief Enele Ma'afu. His eldest son Ratu Tevita Uluilakeba II held the title of Tui Nayau from 1875 until his death in 1876.
