= Vatimi Rayalu =

Fijian politician (1967/1968–2025)

Vatimi Tidara Tuinasakea Kaunitawake Rayalu

Minister for Agriculture and Waterways
- In office 24 December 2022 – 12 June 2025
- Prime Minister: Sitiveni Rabuka

Member of the Fijian Parliament for PA List
- In office 14 December 2022 – 12 June 2025
- Succeeded by: Inosi Kuridrani

Personal details
- Born: 1967 or 1968 Vanua Vatu, Fiji
- Died: 12 June 2025 (aged 57)
- Party: People's Alliance

Vatimi Tidara Tuinasakea Kaunitawake Rayalu (1967 or 1968 — 12 June 2025) was a Fijian politician, and Cabinet Minister. He was a member of the People's Alliance.

== Life and career ==
Rayalu was from Vanua Vatu in the Lau Islands. He was educated at Queen Victoria School and the University of the South Pacific. He worked as a civil servant for the Ministry of Agriculture, rising to the position of Deputy Permanent Secretary.

He contested the 2022 Fijian general election as a PA candidate and was elected with 2072 votes. On 24 December 2022 he was appointed Minister for Agriculture and Waterways in the coalition government of Sitiveni Rabuka.

Rayalu died on 12 June 2025, at the age of 57.
