= Nirbhay Singh =

Nirbhay Singh may refer to:

- Nirbhay Singh (soldier) (1958–1984), Indian soldier
- Nirbhay Singh (trade unionist), Fiji-Indian trade unionist
- Nirbhay N. Singh, psychologist
- Nirbhay Singh Gujjar, Indian dacoit
- Nirbhay Singh Patel, Indian politician
