= Taliai Tupou =

Fijian nobleman

Chief Taliai Tupou of Nayau
- Issue: Ratu Isoa Waqawai, Ratu Seruvatu, Adi Tagici, Roko Laijipa, Ratu Eroni Loganimoce; Ratu Tevita Tuimereke
- Father: Rasolo
- Mother: Radavu

Roko Taliai Tupou (17??-1875) was a Fijian nobleman. He is considered to be the progenitor of the noble household Vatuwaqa in the chiefly Vuanirewa clan and as such, was the first member of this noble household to have the title Tui Nayau. His reign marked the growth of Christianity in Lau and the slow expansion of Tongan ambitions in Fiji, led by Enele Ma'afu. As this time marked increasing contact with Europeans, records from this point forward in regard to the history of Lau are well documented.

== Biography ==
Taliai was the son of Chief Rasolo and Radavu. He was the younger half-brother of Malani and the 3rd Tui Nayau.

Taliai Topou’s early reception of missionaries appears indifferent. He never took them seriously, until he was later influenced by his family members. It is recorded that he only let the Methodist missionaries, David Cargill and William Cross, stay on Lakeba and establish a church after the support of his nephew and heir, Vuetasau. The latter conversion of his favourite daughter, Tagici (after being nursed back to health from a serious illness by a missionary) and the emerging role of Vaubula, Vuetasau’s brother, as an early Fijian preacher appears to have induced him to finally and publicly accept the Christian faith in 1849. From this point forward, Christianity gradually replaced the old religion and gained hold in Lau and the rest of Fiji.

David Cargill describes Taliai Tupou in his journals as a “however reluctant, tributary monarch”. Since he did not have the reserves of manpower like the Tui Cakau or Vunivalu of Bau, he could never risk confrontation with his adversaries and the alternative was to maintain friendly relations over as wide a field as possible. In this sense he can he stated as an astute diplomat, having somewhat maintained Lakeba independence through the occupancy of Enele Ma'afu and ambitions of Bau Island. His sovereignty over Lakeba and its dependencies were never likely threatened by Ma’afu, as Taliai through his mother descended from the royal Tuʻi Tonga and Tu'i Kanokupolu lines. Ma’afu’s father was a former Tui Kanokupolu and therefore would have considered Taliai his kin, but it was Ma’afu’s conquests of the north and western islands from Lakeba, that would greatly extend the domains of later Fijian rulers. In 1865, he concluded a Treaty of Friendship between the Kingdom of Lakeba and the Kingdom of Tonga, and in 1871, he convened a meeting of his chiefs and nominated Ma'afu as leader of the states of Lakeba, Vanua Balavu, and the Moala Islands.

Taliai is noted to have been the longest lived Tui Nayau. Though crippled at the time of negotiations before the Cession of Fiji to Queen Victoria in 1874, he was still being carried about. An observing Australian reporter at the time stated, "Methuselah was an infant to him and death had forgotten him."

He died in 1875 and was succeeded by his grandnephew, Ratu Tevita Uluilakeba II. The latter would only succeed to the title Roko Sau as he would die prematurely a year later in 1876. His death meant that Tupou’s son Eroni Loganimoce would in turn succeed to his nephew’s title and succeed his father becoming the fourth Tui Nayau.
