= Roko (title) =

Roko is a title of chiefly rank, specifically from the Lau Islands of Fiji.

Its equivalent from the Kubuna Confederacy is the Bauan form of Ratu and Ro from parts of the Burebasaga Confederacy. This title was widely used among members of the chiefly Vuanirewa clan up to the mid-19th century. Increasing inte marriage among the chiefly households of Lakeba and Bau, thereafter, saw the increasing use of Ratu and Adi by members of the Vuanirewa dynasty. The current heir to the Tui Nayau title, Finau Mara, uses the Baun title Ratu instead of Roko. This is true for all of his siblings apart from his younger brother Tevita Uluilakeba Mara, who is generally known as Roko Ului.

== See also ==
- Taliai Tupou
