= Jovesa =

Jovesa is a given name. Notable people with the given name include:

- Jovesa Naivalu (born 1978), Fiji-American athlete
- Jovesa Sovasova (1942–2005), Fijian chief
- Jovesa Vocea (fl. 2015), Fijian politician
