= Roko Sau =

Sau Mai Kedekede now more commonly referred to as Sau ni Vanua ko Lau is one of the preeminent titles held by the Paramount Chief of the Lau Islands in Fiji.

== History ==
The title Sau Mai Kedekede originates from the Tongan word “Hau”, denoting the divine nature of the Tu'i Tonga suggesting the frequent intercourse amongst the chiefly houses of Lakeba and Tonga in pre-Christian times. The title of Sau is considered much older and is independent of the title Tui Nayau, now held in tandem by the Paramount Chief of the Lau Islands, as its original holders were from the island of Lakeba (pre-Vuanirewa dynasty).

The first recorded holder of the title was Qilaiso of the Cei-e-kena clan. The Sau title eventually merged in time with the title Tui Nayau, and its dual usage commenced in the person of Rasolo. Both titles Sau Mai Kedekede and Tui Nayau are now inextricably linked, and heirs succeeding to the title Tui Nayau cannot do so unless recognised and installed as Sau Ni Vanua.

== The installation ==
The investment ceremony for the Sau Ni Vanua takes place in Tubou on Lakeba. Once the elders of the Vuanirewa have endorsed the successor to the previous Tui Nayau, the Ramasi or chief makers and Vakavanua being chief herald are summoned to undertake the ceremony. The Ramasi consists of the Tui Tubou and the Ramasi of Nasaqalau and the vanua represented by the Vakavanua of Ceiekena and Tui Soso (from Nukunuku village). During the ceremony the recipient will have a piece of bark cloth tied on his arms by each of the Ramasi and the coronation turban or salasiga placed upon his head by the Vakavanua. He also receives the coronation cup containing kava from the Vuanirewa Nobles, which he must drink to affirm his becoming Sau Ni Vanua O Lau. This is then followed by a general kava ceremony where principal chiefs of rank in Lau drink in turn, ceremonial titles are conferred by the Sau and gifts are presented by his people. The Sau's installation concludes with the removal of the arm bands and ritual bath after four days.

== Title holders ==
The historical holders of the title of Sau Mai Kedekede:

Of the Ceiekena Dynasty (16–17th century):

- Pukunivesikula
- Qilaiso
- Bativanua
- Ginigini
- Vuakilau or Fuakilau

Levuka Occupancy of Lakeba (early to mid-18th century)

- Codro

The Vuanirewa Dynasty (mid-18th century to present) (title merges with Tui Nayau title in the person of Rasolo)
