= Vanua Vatu =

Island of Fiji

- Location within Fiji

Geography
- Location: South Pacific Ocean
- Coordinates: 18°22′20″S 179°16′17″W
- Archipelago: Lau Islands
- Adjacent to: Koro Sea
- Area: 4.24 km^{2} (1.64 sq mi)
- Highest elevation: 79 m (259 ft)

Administration
- Fiji
- Division: Eastern
- Province: Lau Province
- District: Totoya

Vanua Vatu is an island in Fiji. It is located in the Eastern Division, 240 km east of the capital Suva. The area is 4.2 square kilometers.
