= Fakpure =

The fakpure was the secular ruler of Rotuma in the pre-European contact times. It was one of three chiefly roles with direct influence across the island of Rotuma, the other two being the mua and the sau. Traditionally the most senior political authority on the island, the fakpure was one of the gagaj ‘es itu’u of the districts of Rotuma, and the convener of the island’s Council of Chiefs. After being elected as the district chief through the traditional processes (see gagaja), the position of fakpure was bestowed on the most senior of these district chiefs, usually the chief whose district had won the most recent war, who also received the privilege of being the first served in the politically charged kava ceremony.

== Overview ==
In the early European writings on Rotuma, (therefore the earliest recorded information on Rotuma, being prior to Western contact, an oral-based culture), the prevailing understanding of the fakpure was that, prior to Western influence, he was convener and presiding officer of the council of district chiefs, and that he was charged with the appointment and maintenance of the sau, ensuring that the sau, as an earthly altar to placate the gods of fertility was treated lavishly.

Although the conditions in which the fakpure functioned have necessarily changed dramatically, the role of the fakpure, while not strictly existent any more, has been succeeded by the position of the Chair of the Rotuma Island Council. The district claiming the position of Chair and first precedence in the traditional kava ceremony is, in line with Fijian precepts of chiefdom, the "chiefly" district of Noa’tau, who led the Wesleyan alliance, the victors in the Rotuman Religious Wars, the last war on the island which culminated in Rotuma's cession to Great Britain in 1881.

== List of title holders ==
Order	Reigned	Fakpure
1.	unknown	Raho
2.	unknown	Tokaniua
3.	unknown	Fuge
4.	unknown	Kaurfonua
5.	unknown	Safoak
6.	unknown	Savoiat
7.	unknown	Olil
8.	unknown	Fer
9.	unknown	Tuipurotu
10.	unknown	Tokaniua
11.	unknown	Tuitafaga
12.	unknown	Irava
13.	1829 - 1838	Konao
14.	1838 - 1839	Solovalu
15.	1839 - 1852	Riamkau
16.	1852 - 1858	Kausiliafe
17.	1858 - 1862	Riamkau
18.	1862 - ?	Malafu

== Sources ==
- "Fiji's Chiefs and Rulers 1700s to date". Archived from the original on 1 August 2020.
- World Statesman
