= Mua (title) =

The mua was one of three chiefly roles with direct influence across the island of Rotuma, the other two being the fakpure and the sau. The mua was referred as the head priest of the island who presided over rituals and prayers.

== List of title holders ==
Order	Reigned	Mua
1.	unknown	Lapatemasui
2.	unknown	Tuitupu
3.	unknown	Saparere
4.	unknown	Mameata
5.	unknown	Muatoirere
6.	unknown	Ipiuri
7.	unknown	Ifituga
8.	unknown	Fisaitu
9.	unknown	Niua
10.	unknown	Saurotuma
11.	unknown	Tafaki
12.	unknown	Muamea
13.	unknown	Tukumasui
14.	unknown	Yusufumi

== Sources ==
- World Statesmen
- Rotuma.net
