= Tavo =

Tavo was a Sau (often mistranslated as "King"), who reigned in 1867 on Rotuma, Fiji, for a period of six months. He was the 83rd title holder.
