= Meli Bainimarama =

Fijian civil servant (1945–2015)

Ratu Meli Bainimarama (24 September 1945 – 30 November 2023) was a Fijian civil servant and diplomat. He was the older brother of Fijian dictator Frank Bainimarama.

Bainimarama hailed from the village of Kiuva, in Tailevu Province. He joined the Fiji public service in 1967 as a cadet and rose through the ranks. In 1989 he was appointed permanent secretary to the Ministry of Labour and Industrial Relations. He then served as permanent secretary for various other ministries, including the Ministry of Transport, Civil Aviation, Fijian Affairs, Provincial Development, Multi Ethnic Affairs, and Fisheries and Forests. Following the 2006 Fijian coup d'état he was appointed acting chief executive of the Fijian Affairs Board, replacing Adi Litia Qionibaravi, who had been ousted by the military regime. In this role, Bainimarama supervised the workings of the Secretariat of the Great Council of Chiefs and of the fourteen Provinces.

The Fijian Affairs Board officially appointed Bainimarama as its chief executive officer on 29 January 2007, but as part of a reorganization of the civil service by the interim government, Bainimarama was dismissed, along with twenty-two other Chief Executive Officers, on 21 January 2007 after just one day holding the position formally. He was one of four terminated to be re-employed immediately, as a consultant advising the FAB.

In 2011 he was appointed Fiji's High Commissioner to Malaysia and Ambassador to Thailand.
