= Isoa Logavatu =

Fijian cricketer

Personal information
- Full name: Isoa Tuinaceva Logavatu
- Bowling: Right-arm off break, right-arm medium

International information
- National side: Fiji

Career statistics
Competition	FC
Matches	5
Runs scored	73
Batting average	12.16
100s/50s	–/–
Top score	48
Balls bowled	1,242
Wickets	16
Bowling average	30.00
5 wickets in innings	–
10 wickets in match	–
Best bowling	4/46
Catches/stumpings	3/–
- Source: Cricinfo, 13 March 2010

Isoa Tuinaceva Logavatu (born 1925 in Nadi, Fiji; died 1991 in Fiji) was a Fijian cricketer.

Logavatu made his first-class debut for Fiji in 1948 against Auckland during Fiji's 1947/48 tour of New Zealand. During the tour, he played five first-class matches, with his final first-class match coming against Auckland.

In his 5 first-class matches for Fiji he scored 73 runs at a batting average of 12.16, with a high score of 48. With the ball he took 16 wickets at a bowling average of 30.00, with best figures of 4/46. Logavatu took 3 catches in the field.

Logavatu also represented Fiji in 26 non first-class matches from 1948 to 1962, with his final match for Fiji coming against Taranaki during their 1961/62 tour of New Zealand.

Logavatu died in Fiji in 1991.
