= Davila Toganivalu =

Fijian academic and businesswoman

Adi Asilina Davila Toganivalu is a Fijian academic and businesswoman who was the first woman appointed to a company board in Fiji. She is a sister of former President of Fiji Kamisese Mara.

Toganivalu was educated at the University of Southern Queensland in Toowoomba, Australia, whence she graduated with bachelor's degrees in education. She was one of Fiji's first pre-school teachers, working at the YWCA kindergarten in Suva, and later co-ordinated the pre-school education programme at the University of the South Pacific. She later worked for UNICEF as a regional educational officer.

In January 2006 Toganivalu was appointed to the board of the Fiji Times, the first woman to hold such a position. The appointment, which is for three years, was approved by News Limited in Sydney, Australia, the parent company of the Fiji Times. She was chosen to fill a vacancy caused by the resignation of Ratu Joni Madraiwiwi, left the board following his election to the Vice-Presidency of Fiji at the beginning of 2005.

In May 2009 she was selected as part of the judging panel for the Pride of Fiji Awards.

In the leadup to the 2022 Fijian general election she was one of a group of women who challenged the constitutionality of a new electoral law which required married women to re-register as voters.
