= Totoya =

Volcanic island in the Lau Islands, Fiji

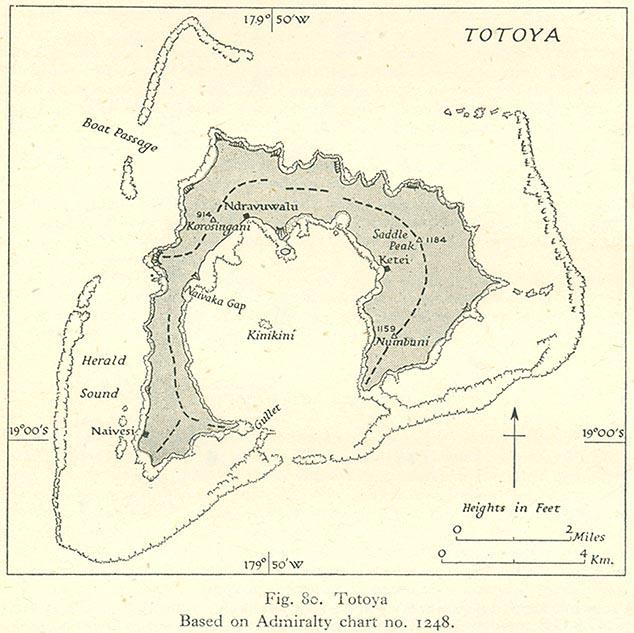
- Chart of Totoya from 1944

- Location within Fiji

Geography
- Location: South Pacific Ocean
- Coordinates: 18.9584799°S 179.8791945°W
- Archipelago: Moala Islands
- Adjacent to: Koro Sea
- Area: 28 km^{2} (11 sq mi)
- Highest elevation: 366 m (1201 ft)

Administration
- Fiji
- Division: Eastern
- Province: Lau Province
- District: Yasawa
- Largest settlement: Tovu

Demographics
- Population: 624 (2017)

Totoya is a volcanic island and tikina in the Moala subgroup of Fiji's Lau archipelago. It occupies an area of 28 km^{2}, making it the smallest of the Yasayasa Moala Group. Its maximum elevation is 366 metres (1,201 feet) above sea level. The main economic activity is coconut farming.

Totoya falls under the provincial administration of the Lau group.

== Geography ==
The horseshoe-shaped island is well protected by a high reef. There are a number of boat passages through the surrounding reef. These passages lead into the deep bay that is surrounded by the island. Its surfing is world-renowned, but the difficulty in reaching the island keeps most away.

The island has a well-placed jetty, 4 primary schools, not including Vanuavatu, which has its own, a Post office/shop, and radio-telephone stations at Ketei and Dravuwalu. It is accessible technologically by satellite phone provided by Telecom Fiji, but not mobile cellular phones.

The island has 4 villages with Tovu, the capital and seat of the Turaga na Roko Sau whose household site is known as "Mataiilakeba". Ketei is the seat of Tui Ketei, traditionally known as Ramalo, the King maker. The "Turaga Ramalo" has the ancient and prestigious role of installing Totoya's High chief, a role that has become obsolete because of rivalry. The third village, Dravuwalu, is the seat of Tui Dravuwalu, traditionally known as Nakorowaiwai and Udu, the fourth village, is the seat of Tui Udu, traditionally known as Muaicokalau. The island of Vanuavatu, although closer to the islands of Lakeba and Nayau than the island of Totoya, is listed as the fifth village within the District and is the seat of Tui Vanua.

Vanua Vatu has historically and traditionally been the personal possession of the Turaga Na Roko Sau, the High Chief of Totoya and the Yasayasa Moala Group as a whole. Further to this in colonial times when the colonial government administratively subdivided the Provinces into districts, with a colonial appointed chief or 'Buli' as leader the island had to fall into a colonially administered district under Totoya. Traditionally the High Chief of Totoya district, Roko Sau has dominion over Vanuavatu island and its people. However, Vanuavatu is the seat of Tui Vanua who answers directly to the Roko Sau. Also present within Vanuavatu is the title of Matakitotoya a representative post which further links the Roko Sau to his people and land of Vanuavatu and avoids any alienation from it.

The chiefly village of Tovu (Dawaleka) was shifted from its former site at the opposite side of the island (Navuli) in the 1800s through traditional request from Ramalo and other island chiefs to ease their undertaking of traditional obligations to the Roko Sau, the island's Head Chief.

The island is very rich in marine resources and one could have a field day out at sea. One famous delicacy is Lairo or land crabs, which are plentiful all year round. Giant sea clam, a variety of seaweeds and just about any variety of fish can be caught by angling, spear fishing, net fishing, underwater diving, or by traditional means.

Compared to its bigger subgroup neighbours of Moala and Matuku, the soil on Totoya is not very fertile, and is good for only small-scale subsistence farming. Cassava, sweet potato, and yams grow well on the island whereas dalo does not grow well and is only grown in waterlogged, well irrigated areas in small quantities for domestic consumption. The island has its fair share of wildlife, too, which includes bats, birds, and reptiles, including snakes, along with the introduced domestic animal species, dogs and cats brought in from the urban centres.

== History and culture ==
An important part of Totoya is the sacred passage "Daveta Tabu". Tradition dictates that if one wants to pass through this passage, one has to follow traditional protocol by observing utter complete silence and most importantly to be seated in the traditional manner (seated cross-legged with feet resting beneath the knees for gentlemen and for ladies, legs bent at knees resting on the side). The head is to be bowed with all mannerisms applicable in a traditional funeral. Legend has it that this is done in tribute for an infant child of a Roka Sau born to a Tongan princess, buried at sea in the passage. The protocol was instigated by the child's father. Legend also has it that ignorance or failing to fully and correctly observe the taboo would instigate furious reaction from the sea; as was proven in the past. Many seafarers in the modern day, even the most experienced captains and skippers, would opt to forgo entering by the passage even with the Turaga Roko Sau (the only one with the ancient traditional authority to use the passage without any life-threatening implications) on board the vessel, as was evident in a recent trip on board the Lady Sandy in the year 2011.

One episode that shows the link between Lakeba and Totoya was the arrival of Christianity. The Turaga Tui Nayau at that time sent his wife and herald to Dawaleka, the Koro makawa of Tovu. At Dawaleka, the Bete or High Priest was performing his ritual whereupon he envisioned a canoe coming in through the boat passage at Yaro; he proclaimed, "I will stop here as the one coming in white is shining and much stronger than me". He disrobed and came down to shore with the villagers to greet the group from Lakeba.

== Effects of climate change ==
This volcanic island, like many other islands, atolls and islets around the world, is subject to the changing face of nature through the years. In the village of Dravuwalu, one of four villages located along the fringes of the remnant caldera, tombstones lie exposed along the beach, evidence of the receding beach line, as the area used to be five to fifteen metres (16–49 feet) away from the shoreline. The second principal village on the island, Ketei, is also a testament to the effects of climate change. Heavy rain after seasonal droughts would bring heavy flooding with the river running through the village, bursting its banks, plunging through homes. Rows of coconut trees lining coastlines and village shorelines have disappeared because of heavy swells brought about by adverse weather through the years. Food security is also a concern on the island with receding coastal lines; former plantations sites are now not plantable with villages having to look further inland for fertile soil.

== Prominent Totoya people ==
The Paramount Chief of Totoya is known as the Sau mai Totoya. This title is currently held by Roko Josefa Cinavilakeba, who is also the community and government relations coordinator for the NGO Pacific Blue Foundation.

Other prominent residents of Totoya include:

- Malele, Enele, who was the former Fiji rugby rep and captain.
- Captain Saumi, Nacanieli, who was an Air Pacific pilot.
- Savou, Josateki, was a former Fiji sevens player and coach.
- Savou, Salesi and Savou, Joiji (brothers, a physician and dentist respectively) from Ketei village.
- Savou, Trevor, a former Manawatu and New Zealand Rugby Sevens player.
- Peni Gavidi, former civil servant and now a consultant with his own company, PGavidi Planning and Environment Consultants
- Sekope Raikoro, local musician and now Gospel singer
- Takayawa, Nacanieli, winner of the Manchester's Commonwealth Games gold medal in judo. Younger son of Viliame Takayawa
- Takayawa, Viliame, the father of judo in Fiji.
- Takayawa, Viliame Waka, a sport administrator and scientist, eldest son of Viliame Takayawa.
- Aisea Taoka, who was the Deputy Commissioner of Police before becoming the Commissioner of prisons.
- Mataika Tuicakau, who made Fiji world-famous by winning the shot-put gold medal in the 1958 Empire (Commonwealth) Games in Auckland. He also won the silver medal in the discus/javelin event.
- Viliame Waka, who was a former school teacher, airport administrator, and Fiji rugby rep.
- Dr. Tupou Wata, renowned gynecologist/medical practitioner and operates a private clinic in Suva
- Kevueli Bulamainaivalu, former Assistant Commissioner of Police
- Pita Bulamainaivalu, former State Prosecutor and Lecturer at Law at the School of Law, University of the South Pacific
- Tevita Tupou, General Manager Customs at the Fiji Revenue & Customs Authority
