= Peter Ridgeway =

Australian lawyer

Peter Ridgway is an Australian prosecutor and a former Deputy Director of Prosecutions in Fiji who was expelled from the country by the Qarase government in 2005.

As Deputy Director of Prosecutions Ridgeway was responsible for investigating alleged links between members of the government and the 2000 Fijian coup d'état. He strongly criticized the government's early release of coup convicts, and the Reconciliation, Tolerance, and Unity Bill which he interpreted as a legal mechanism for pardoning individuals convicted of participating in the coup.

Ridgeway's contract expired in May 2005 and was not renewed. Prime Minister Laisenia Qarase subsequently blocked a move to reinstate him, and in June 2005 he was expelled from Fiji on 24 hours notice. Ridgeway subsequently accused the government of interfering with the course of justice by intervening in a number of coup-related trials.

On 31 December 2006, Commodore Frank Bainimarama, who had deposed Qarase in a military coup on 5 December, invited Ridgway to return to Fiji to restart his investigations into the 2000 coup. In February 2007 he returned to Fiji to work for the military regime.
