= Vitogo =

Vitogo is a district (tikina) of Lautoka in Ba Province, Fiji. It comprises the villages of Vitogo, Namoli, Naviago, Vakabuli, and Saru. In 2026, 3,177 acres (1,286 ha) of land was returned to the district of Vitogo, 102 years after it had been sold to the then-colonial government as part of the Lautoka Water Supply Catchment Area. Since 2025, the Tui Vitogo or traditional chief of the district is Ratu Jone Sovasova.
