= Jovesa Sovasova =

Fijian tribal chief

Ratu Jovesa Daurua Tana Sovasova (c. 1942 – 7 April 2005) was a Fijian chief. He held the title of Tui Vitogo, or Paramount Chief of Vitogo district in Lautoka, Ba Province. He held the title from 30 June 1970 till his death.

In his funeral eulogy, Lautoka police chief Rusiate Saini praised Ratu Jovesa Sovasova for his efforts to foster cooperative relationships for economic and social prosperity. He also supported economic development projects in housing, policing, and electrification.

He was succeeded by his younger brother, Ratu Viliame Sovasova. In 2025, Ratu Jone Sovasova, the eldest son of Ratu Jovesa Tana Sovasova, was installed as Tui Vitogo.
