= Litia Qionibaravi =

Adi Litia Qionibaravi
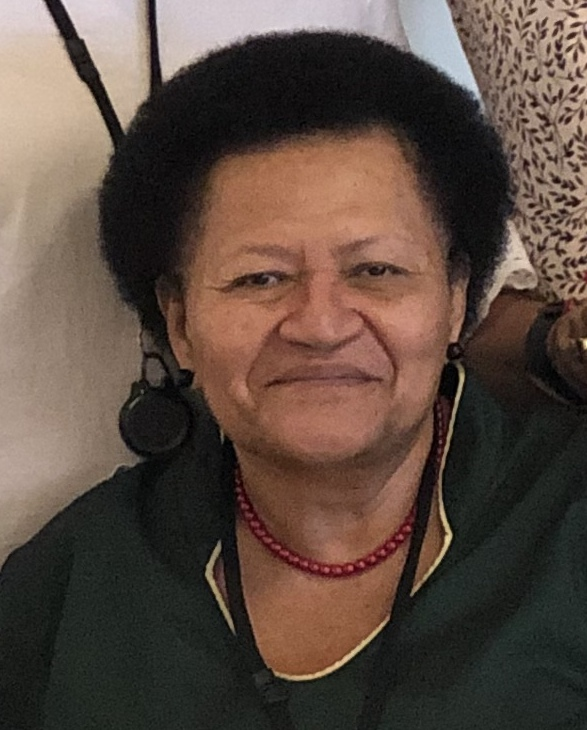

Member of the Fijian Parliament for SODELPA List
- In office 14 November 2018 – 14 December 2022

Personal details
- Party: Social Democratic Liberal Party

Adi Litia Qionibaravi is a Fijian chief and former civil servant and member of the Parliament of Fiji. She is a member of the Social Democratic Liberal Party.

== Early life ==
Qionibaravi is from Ucunivanua in Verata, Tailevu Province. She trained as a lawyer, then worked as a civil servant, serving more than thirty years in the Fijian Affairs Ministry. On 17 June 2005 she was appointed for a five-year term as chief executive officer of the Fijian Affairs Board (FAB). In this capacity, she oversaw the work of the country's fourteen Provincial Councils, the Fijian Affairs scholarship unit, and the Secretariat of the Great Council of Chiefs.

Qionibaravi was purportedly dismissed as FAB CEO by the military regime following the 2006 Fijian coup d'état. Three armed soldiers had evicted her from her office in the building of the Native Lands Trust Board (NLTB), and she was replaced by dictator Frank Bainimarama's brother, Meli Bainimarama. Neither Qionibaravi or the Great Council of Chiefs accepted her dismissal, and she continued to work from an improvised office in the Great Council of Chiefs Secretariat. The Fijian Affairs Board formalized the termination of Qionibaravi's contract on 20 January 2007. The newly appointed board - consisting of five interim Cabinet Ministers and chaired by Ratu Epeli Ganilau, the Interim Minister for Fijian Affairs formally dismissed her at an emergency meeting called "to regularize the issue of Adi Litia," in Ganilau's words.

Following her dismissal, the military regime accused her of corruption, claiming she had misused government funds to buy a personal vehicle and to pay the two workers renovating her house in Ma'afu Street, Suva. On 23 December, Qionibaravi replied that she was "shocked" to hear the allegations, but refused to comment further. On 23 December she held a press conference and angrily denied the allegations, saying that she owned no house in Ma'afu Street; she had an FAB office there, she said. The car had been purchased with a loan approved by her superior, the Permanent Secretary for Fijian Affairs.

== Political career ==
Qionibaravi was appointed general secretary of the Social Democratic Liberal Party in February 2016. As general secretary, she reformed the party constitution. She was elected to parliament in the 2018 elections, winning 2,195 votes. She was the Opposition nominee for the role of Deputy Speaker, but lost in a parliamentary vote to Veena Bhatnagar. In her first speech to the House on 29 November 2018 she criticised the Fijian Parliament's ban on the use of the Fijian language in debate. She stepped down as SODELPA general secretary at the party's 2019 AGM.

In December 2020 she was charged by the Fiji Independent Commission Against Corruption with providing false information to a public servant and obtaining financial advantage by lying about her place of residence to access parliamentary allowances. The trial was repeatedly delayed due to Qionibaravi's ill-health, and is now expected to begin on 31 March 2023.

On 25 July 2021 she was arrested by Fijian police after criticising government moves to amend land legislation.

She did not run for re-election at the 2022 election, and retired.
