= Niumataiwalu =

Fijian chief

Chief Niumataiwalu
- Spouse: Tarau of Totoya
- Issue: Sivoki; Uluilakeba I; Rasolo; Matawalu
- Father: Delaivugalei
- Mother: Vulase

Niumataiwalu was a Fijian high chief.

== Etymology ==
The name Niumataiwalu, translated as "I came first to Walu beach", was in memory of Naosara.

== Family ==
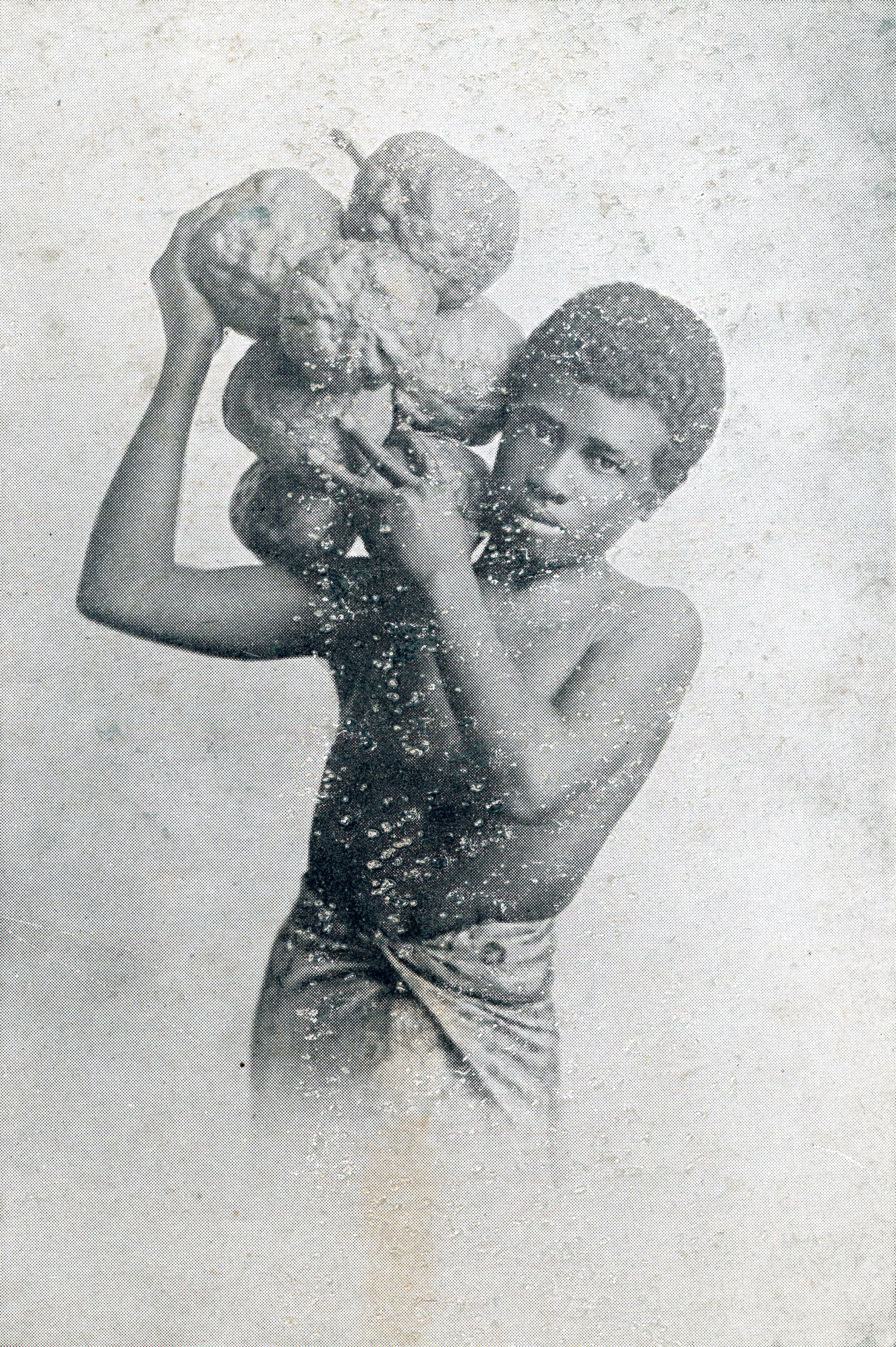
Fijian legend has it that Niumataiwalu was renowned not only for his valour in battle but also for his beauty.

Niumataiwalu's father, Delaivugalei, was the brother of Qoma, whose father was Kalouyalewa. Niumataiwalu had three wives and multiple children; his recorded wives and children, in order of seniority, were:

- By Radini Levuka
  - Banuve Baleivavalagi (father of Tanoa Visawaqa)
- By his first wife, Tarau of Totoya
  - Sivoki
  - Uluilakeba I
  - Rasolo
  - Mokoi
- By his second wife, Uma of Nukunuku
  - Matawalu
- By his third wife (name unknown), from Cakaudrove
  - Lubati
