= Patrick Raddock =

Fijian cricketer

Patrick Raddock MBE
Personal information
- Full name: Patrick Tasman Raddock
- Born: 31 October 1920; Suva, Rewa Province, Fiji
- Died: 23 May 1977 (aged 56); Suva, Rewa Province, Fiji
- Batting: Right-handed
- Role: Wicketkeeper

International information
- National side: Fiji

Career statistics
Competition	FC
Matches	9
Runs scored	337
Batting average	21.06
100s/50s	–/1
Top score	89
Balls bowled	–
Wickets	–
Bowling average	–
5 wickets in innings	–
10 wickets in match	–
Best bowling	–
Catches/stumpings	11/10
- Source: Cricinfo, 13 March 2010

Patrick Tasman Raddock MBE (31 October 1925 – 23 May 1977) was a Fijian cricketer. Raddock was a right-handed batsman who played primarily as a wicketkeeper.

Raddock made his first-class debut for Fiji in 1948 against Auckland during Fiji's tour of New Zealand. From 1948 to 1954 he played 9 first-class matches for Fiji, with his final first-class appearance coming against Auckland during Fiji's 1953/54 tour of New Zealand.

In his 9 first-class matches for Fiji he scored 337 runs at a batting average of 21.06, with a single half century score of 89 against Wellington in 1954. Behind the stumps Raddock took 11 catches and made 10 stumpings.

Raddock also represented Fiji in 18 non first-class matches from 1948 to 1956, with his final match for Fiji coming against the touring West Indians.

He was appointed Member of the Order of the British Empire (MBE) in the 1971 New Year Honours.

Raddock died at Suva on 23 May 1977.
