= Miki Wali =

Fijian activist

- Born: Fiji
- Occupation(s): Activist for democracy, transgender rights and the impact of climate change
- Employer: FemTALK 89FM
- Organization(s): Fiji Youth for Democracy; Haus of Khameleon; Pacific Feminist Forum; International Lesbian, Gay, Bisexual, Trans and Intersex Association (ILGA) Oceania

Miki Charlamagne Wali is a Fijian activist for democracy, transgender rights and the impact of climate change. She is the Director of the Haus of Khameleon, a movement led by transgender women and gender non-conforming Fijians, and co-chair of International Lesbian, Gay, Bisexual, Trans and Intersex Association (ILGA) Oceania. Wali was part of the Pacific Young Women's Caucus at the United Nations (UN) in 2015, and has campaigned as the Public Relations Officer of Fiji Youth for Democracy. She also presents radio program Miki on Monday's on the women led community radio station FemTALK 89FM.

== Biography ==
In 2013, after Fiji's military-backed regime scrapped the 2012 People's Draft constitution, which had been written by Yash Ghai after consultations with the Fijian population, Wali was Public Relations Officer for the group Fiji Youth for Democracy which presented a petition to the prime minister's office calling for the draft constitution to be reinstated. The group had collected 165 signatures. She also called for more consultation with young people and a referendum on the change to the Flag of Fiji.

At the 59th Session on the UN Commission on the Status of Women (CSW) in 2015, Wali was part of the Pacific Young Women's Caucus, heading the drafting and governance strategies team with the Pacific Youth Council's (PYC) Tahere Siisiialafia. In 2016, Wali contributed to the Pacific Feminist Forum's "Pacific Feminist Charter," launched at the University of the South Pacific.

Wali is the Director of the Haus of Khameleon, a movement that is led by transgender women and gender non-conforming Fijians. As Director, in 2018 she worked with the Asia Pacific Transgender Network to campaign for legal gender recognition for transgender people in Fiji and to call for the government to sign the International Covenant on Civil and Political Rights (ICCPR) and the International Covenant on Economic, Social and Cultural Rights (ICESCR). The Haus of Khameleon has also published research on discrimination faced by Fijian transgender women, titled "Every Breath a Transgender Women Takes is an Act of Revolution: Fighting for Intersectional Justice in Fiji", under Wali's leadership. She has also spoken at international panel discussions organised by the UN Secretary-General’s Envoy on Youth's LGBT Core Group.

Wali is the host of FemLINKPACIFIC's program Miki on Monday's on women led community radio station FemTALK 89FM, which is part of the Rainbow Connections collaboration between the Haus of Khameleon, Rainbow Women's Network and Diverse Voices and Action for Equality Fiji. She is also co-chair of ILGA Oceania.

Wali is a climate change activist and called for Pacific Islanders to protest outside Australian and New Zealand High Commissions, Embassies and Consul Offices. In 2019, she was recognised as one of the 2019 Global Climate sHeroes by the Human Impacts Institute.
