= Tubou =

Village on the Fijian island of Lakeba

- Village
- Location in Fiji
- Country: Fiji
- Division: Eastern Division
- Province: Lau
- Island: Lakeba
- Archipelago: Lau Islands

Population
  - Total: c. 2,000
- Time zone: UTC+12 (Fiji Time)

Tubou is a village on the Fijian island of Lakeba, with a population of about 2,000. One of eight villages on Lakeba, it is considered the capital of the Lau Islands, being the seat of the Vuanirewa clan, a powerful chiefly family from which Fiji's longtime Prime Minister and President, Ratu Sir Kamisese Mara (1920–2004) and one of Fiji's famous cricketers I. L. Bula (born 1921), hailed.

The Tongan-Fijian warlord Enele Ma'afu, who conquered much of eastern and northern Fiji in the mid-19th century, is buried in Tubou, as are Ratu Sir Lala Sukuna (1888–1958), Fiji's first modern statesman, and Ratu Sir Kamisese Mara. Many early Christian missionaries are also buried in Tubou.
