= Nirbhay Singh (trade unionist) =

Nirbhay Singh is a Fiji Indian trade unionist, and who is the Senior Industrial Relations Officer [SIRO] of Fiji Public Service Association. He also serves as the Spokesperson for the Fiji Confederation of Public Sector Unions (CPSU).

Singh opposed the Minister of Labour, Bernadette Rounds Ganilau's, intention to mediate in the proposed talks on the five percent pay cut and reduction of retirement age for civil servants stating that:

That Minister for Labour sat in the cabinet, and made a decision and agreed and endorsed the decision for paycuts and for retirement age change, now the same minister has a conflict of interest if he or she wants to come and mediate in which she was a party before.

Singh expressed the hope that Fiji Government's partnership with the European Union would go some way towards avoiding strike action. He is quoted as saying:

So there may be some positive indications in future, because the European Union has indicated that they’d like to have it all recorded, and certified in a form of a partnership agreement, with the European Union now that is very significant and important.

Singh has expressed the view that his confederation would like a dialogue with the Bainimarama Government instead of going on strike in opposition to the 5% pay cut for public sector employees.

Singh accused the Government of using delaying tactics and not taking the threat of strike action seriously.

== Background and Family ==
Singh was born in Ba and educated at Arya Kanya Pathshala, Namosau Methodist Mission School and Xavier College, Ba. He is married with two daughters, Rebecca Jane Singh and Chelsey Anne Singh. He worked at the Nadi International Airport as a communications officer, rising to the position of Chief Communications Officer. He has been an active member of the Fiji Public Service Association (FPSA) and following the 1987 coup was forcefully removed from his post at the airport for his union activities. Following the resignation of Mahendra Chaudhry from the position of General Secretary of the FPSA in 1999, he unsuccessfully contested the election for the position.
