= Lau Province =

Province of Fiji

Coordinates: 18°20′S 178°30′W

Lau Province बा प्रांत (Fiji Hindi)
- Province
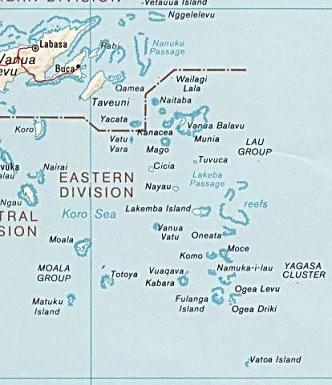
- The Lau Islands
- Interactive map of Lau Province
- Country: Fiji
- Division: Eastern Division

Area
  - Total: 487 km^{2} (188 sq mi)

Population (2017)
  - Total: 9,539
  - Density: 19.6/km^{2} (50.7/sq mi)

Lau Province is one of fourteen provinces of Fiji. Its capital is at Tubou, at the southern end of the island of Lakeba. The province forms part of the country's Eastern Division (which also includes the provinces of Kadavu and Lomaiviti), and of the Tovata Confederacy, a traditional hierarchy of chiefs from northern and eastern Fiji.

Geographically it consists of the Lau Archipelago. The Lau group comprises 57 islands, 19 of which are inhabited, and has a total land area of around 490 square kilometres (190 sq mi).

In 2021 Lau Province banned spearfishing at night in order to protect the marine ecosystem and biodiversity. Previously, communities from more than 30% of the province had banned the practice.

== Demographics ==
At the most recent census in 2017, Lau had a population of 9,539, down from 10,683 in 2007 and 14,500 in 1976, making it the third-least populous province. As of 2007, about 57,500 people born in Lau Province lived elsewhere in Fiji.

=== 2017 Census ===
Tikina (District)	Ethnicity						Total
Tikina (District)	iTaukei	%	Indo-Fijian	%	Other	%	Total
Cicia	1,020	99.2	6	0.6	2	0.2	1,028
Kabara	655	99.8	0	0.0	1	0.2	656
Lakeba	1,542	99.0	12	0.8	3	0.2	1,557
Lau Other Islands	236	80.8	29	9.9	27	9.2	292
Lomaloma	895	97.8	8	0.9	12	1.3	915
Matuku	513	98.3	5	1.0	4	0.8	522
Moala	1,377	99.6	2	0.1	4	0.3	1,383
Moce	424	99.1	3	0.7	1	0.2	428
Mualevu	826	98.6	7	0.8	5	0.6	838
Nayau	291	99.3	1	0.3	1	0.3	293
Oneata	147	100.0	0	0.0	0	0.0	147
Ono	523	99.8	1	0.2	0	0.0	524
Totoya	622	99.7	1	0.2	1	0.2	624
Vulaga	332	100.0	0	0.0	0	0.0	332
Province	9,403	98.6	75	0.8	61	0.6	9,539
