= Roko Malani =

Roko Malani (died 1833) was high chief of the Fijian island of Lakeba. He held the title Tui Nayau (paramount chief of the Lau Islands) and was a popular chief. He increased the influence the island of Lakeba had in Fiji.

The first Christian missionaries arrived in Fiji in 1830 at Malani's request, these were three Tahitian missionaries of the London Missionary Society.

Malani's younger brother, Taliai Tupou, succeeded him as Tui Nayau after Malani's death in 1833. Malani's son, Vuetasau, was among the first Fijians to convert to Christianity.

== Sources ==
- The covenant makers : Islander missionaries in the Pacific. Munro, Doug., Thornley, Andrew. Suva, Fiji: Pacific Theological College and the Institute of Pacific Studies at the University of the South Pacific. 1996. p. 108. ISBN 9820201268. OCLC 37027811.
- Spurway, John (2015). Ma'afu, prince of Tonga, chief of Fiji : the life and times of Fiji's first Tui Lau. Canberra. ISBN 978-1-925021-18-9. OCLC 908771405.
- Thornley, Andrew (2000). The inheritance of hope : John Hunt : apostle of Fiji. Institute of Pacific Studies, the University of the South Pacific. ISBN 9820201594. OCLC 47830991.
