= Sau (title) =

Sau (often mistranslated as “King”), refers to the role of spiritual leader in pre-Christian Rotuman society. The title was neither primogenitary nor held for a lifetime, but rather was cycled through the chiefs of each of Rotuma's districts.

== Overview ==
The position of sau was primarily tied to Rotuma's pre-Christian fertility cult and the worship of the supreme deity Tagroa Siria. This is reflected in the fact that each reign was generally for the six-month ritual cycle of the Rotuman calendar. At the beginning of each sau's reign, they would be installed by the fakpure or secular ruler, and would subsequently be deified for six months, in the polity's hope that the appeasement of the sau, as a proxy for the God on earth, would result in prosperity and peace on the island.

There were also instances where the sau was female, then called "sauhani". The other major political roles in Rotuman society were the fakpure and the mua.

== List of title holders ==
Order	Reigned	Sau
1.	unknown	Sauhani
2.	unknown	Kaurifanua
3.	unknown	Riamkau
4.	unknown	Kaufose
5.	unknown	Taio
6.	unknown	Fonomanu
7.	unknown	Varomua
8.	unknown	Tiu I
9.	unknown	Marafu-Kauat
10.	unknown	Irava
11.	unknown	Tokoara
12.	unknown	Asesekava
13.	unknown	Mariseu
14.	unknown	Sakanane
15.	unknown	Tausia
16.	unknown	Sautupuak
17.	unknown	Paka
18.	unknown	Ravak
19.	unknown	Tokoniua
20.	unknown	Titofag
21.	unknown	Irava
22.	unknown	Ravak
23.	unknown	Tua-Oajo
24.	1820	Gagafag
25.	1825	Fatafesi
26.	1829	Fatenefau
27.	1833	Vuna
28.	1838	Fatafesi
29.	1838	Tamanava
30.	1839	Solovalu
31.	1839	Riamkau
32.	1839	Tirasoko
33.	1840	Otorovao
34.	1841	Ragafua
35.	1843	Vaurasi
36.	1843	Vavaoti
37.	1845	Ufat
38.	1845	Patipat Vavahina
39.	1845	Furisefaua
40.	1845	Tirotorava
41.	1846	Marafu
42.	1846	Pogisemose
43.	1846	Tarupea
44.	1846	Sukamaso
45.	1847	Mua
46.	1847	Kausirafe
47.	1847	Toporotu
48.	1848	Tokaniua
49.	1849	Garagasau
50.	1850	Fakarufono
51.	1850	Matagatage
52.	1851	Manava
53.	1851	Sokagatau
54.	1851	Vavaoti
55.	1851	Tavao
56.	1852	Vaimanoko
57.	1852	Katoagatau
58.	1854	Kautane
59.	1855	Fonogarotoi
60.	1856	Tiporotu
61.	1857	Fonmanu
62.	1858	Tiu II
63.	1858	Sarsartau
64.	1859	Taipo
65.	1859	Kauika
66.	1860	Faoriro
67.	1860	Farapapau
68.	1860	Saurorota
69.	1860	Ufamarata
70.	1862	Sarasortau
71.	1862	Teau
72.	1864	Ufagatau
73.	1865	Kavasakamua
74.	1865	Saurativa
75.	1865	Fotoafuru
76.	1865	Fonomanu
77.	1866	Jimi
78.	1866	Varea
79.	1866	Ravak
80.	1866	Maraa
81.	1867	Fonomanu
82.	1867	Vasea
83.	1867	Tavo
84.	1867	Sokagaitu
85.	1868	Ragafua
86.	1868	Irava
87.	1868	Hanifiro-Asoatemuri
88.	1868	Tuipenau
89.	1869	Tigarea
90.	1869	Vasea
91.	1869	Maraia
92.	1869–1870	Suakamasa

== Sources ==
- Fijibure
- World Statesman
