= Nayau =

Island in Fiji

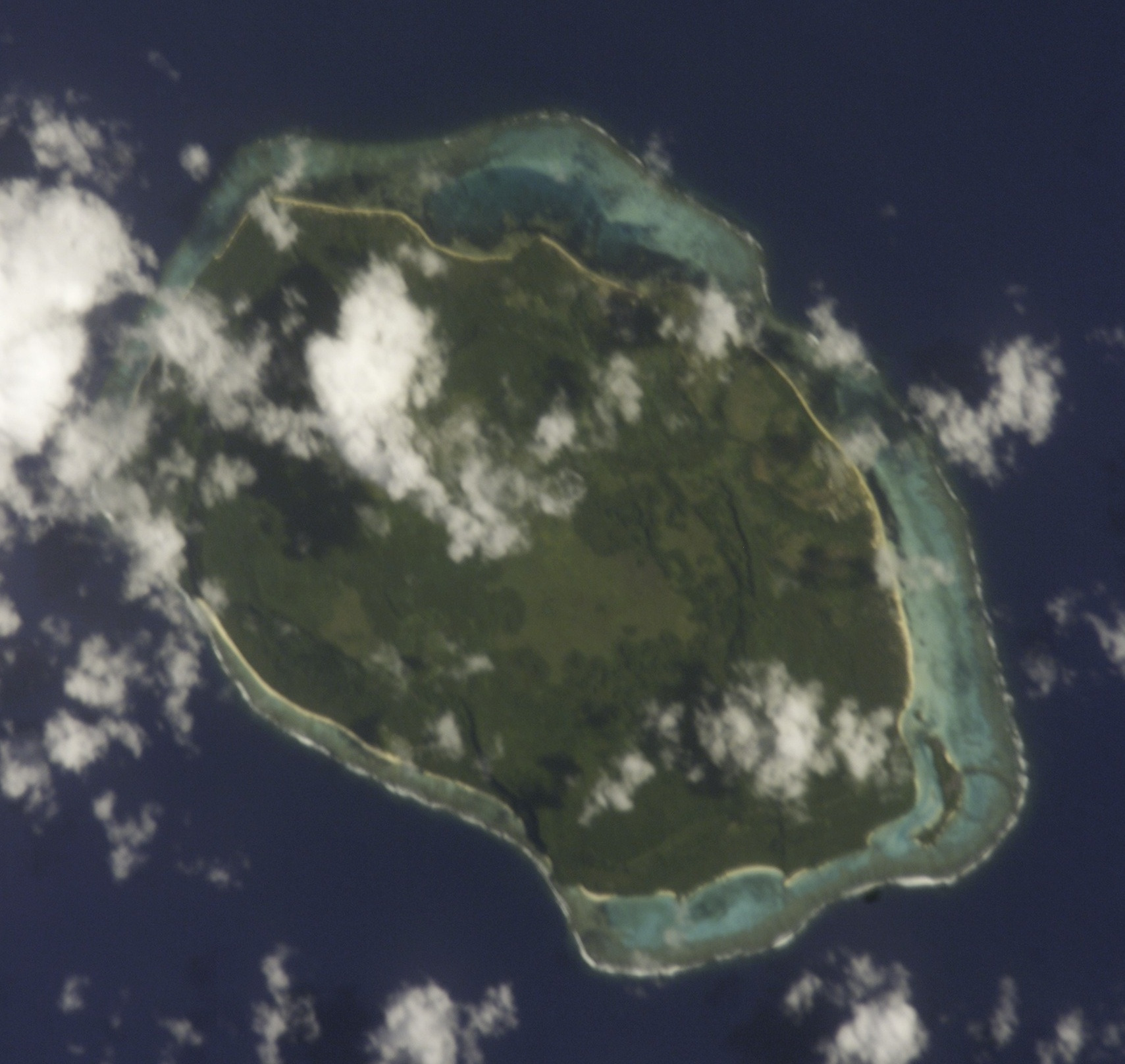
- NASA astronaut image of Nayau island, Lau Archipelago, Fiji

- Location within Fiji

Geography
- Location: Koro Sea; South Pacific Ocean
- Coordinates: 17°59′S 179°3′W
- Archipelago: Lau Islands

Administration
- Fiji
- Division: Eastern Division
- Province: Lau

Demographics
- Population: 293 (2017)

Nayau is an island in Fiji, a tikina in and member of the Lau archipelago. It is the ancestral island of the Vuanirewa Clan, who were moved to the nearby island of Lakeba.

Nayau is located in the Koro Sea, between Cicia and Lakeba islands. There are three villages located on the island: Narocivo, Liku and Salia ,with Narocivo being the principle Village on the Island.

== History ==
Charles Wilkes visited the island in 1840. In 1979 Hurricane Meli struck the island, causing severe damage to two villages and leading to the deaths of several people.

In 2009 the island had around 400 persons.

== Economy ==
The main export of the island is copra, derived from coconut trees.

== Geography ==
The island is ringed by shallow reefs. Its coastal shores are thought to have been formed by storm-wave depositions.

It is located at 17°58'39"S 179°3'13"W, northwest of Lakeba.
