= Uluilakeba =

Fijian ship

The Uluilakeba was a Fijian steamship that served as the primary means of transport from its capital, Suva, to some of the outer islands. She was 112 feet (34 m) long. On December 10, 1973, Cyclone Lottie hit and capsized the Uluilakeba with 106 passengers and crew on board, many of whom were schoolchildren heading home to Suva for the Christmas holidays. With no distribution of lifejackets, there were only 41 survivors in one of the worst modern marine disasters in Fijian history.
