= Vuanirewa =

Tribe (yavusa) of the Lau Islands, Fiji

== Origins ==
The members of this clan all hail from the village of Tubou on the island of Lakeba and from their original roots in Nayau. The Lakeba faction are the descendants of Kalouyalewa whom now form four noble households that make up the tribe. These four noble households are Matailakeba, Vatuwaqa, Koroicumu and Naivi and all claim descent from the first High Chief of the dynasty, Niumataiwalu, a grandson of Kalouyalewa.

== A shift in power ==
Naivi is traditionally the eldest of the households; however due to historic power struggles, Naivi and Koroicumu were subdued in battle by the younger households of Vatuwaqa and Matailakeba. Therefore, all claims to the title can only be asserted from members of the latter two noble households.

== The Paramount Title of Vuanirewa ==
The Tui Nayau, or Paramount Chief of the Lau Islands, has traditionally come from the noble house of Matailakeba. The most recent holder of this title was Ratu Sir Kamisese Mara (1920-2004), who was installed in 1969. He belonged to the Matailakeba household and was a direct descendant of Roko Rasolo. Roko Rasolo's lineage continued through his son, Roko Malani I of Matailakeba followed by his son Ratu William Vuetasau, whose children were Roko Josateki Malani II, Adi Fane Sivoki, Ratu Tevita Uluilakeba I, and Ratu Wilisoni Tuiketei. Ratu Tevita Uluilakeba I's son, Ratu Alifereti Ulukalala Finau, had a son, Ratu Tevita Uluilakeba II, who was the father of Ratu Sir Kamisese Mara.

During the reign of Uluilakeba of Naivi the son of Niumataiwalu, a power struggle occurred that resulted in the death of Uluilakeba of Naivi by Codro and his followers. Codro, who had Bauan roots and who now lived in Levuka (a village not far from Tubou), continued to torment and subdue the people of Lakeba. Prior to this though, Rasolo of Matailakeba the brother of Uluilakeba of Naivi, was banished to Nayau since Uluilakeba suspected him of having an affair with his wife and during this time Matawalu of Navutoka also brother to Uluilakeba of Naivi, was in Bau but resided in Nayau with Rasolo of Matailakeba.

So when Lakebans looked for a leader, they looked to Nayau where the two brothers of Uluilakeba of Naivi were still residing with their uncle, Delailoa. Delailoa was the remaining son of Qoma (younger brother to Delaivugalei who was Niumataiwalu's father) that survived Niumataiwalu slaying all his brothers and father before he himself was slain in Ono. Niumataiwalu, realizing that there was only one close relative alive, Delailoa (since all his brothers and his father were slain by Qoma's children that Niumataiwalu had exacted revenge for), and prior to his slaying in Ono, called Delailoa and sent him to Nayau to retain his name and their position of Tui Nayau.

When Matawalu of Nayavutoka returned to Lakeba after the elders asked him to be their chief in Lakeba (after defeating Codro), it was then decided by the priest at Nayau that the two brothers should jump off a cliff at Delaiwawa, the highest peak near Narocivo village, and that the one that survived would be installed as Sau kei Lakeba. Rasolo jumped and was cushioned by a Rewa tree (from whence the Vuanirewa name came from) and he then was also installed as Tui Nayau and given the household name Matailakeba.

== Nayau installation ==
The traditional installation of the title of Tui Nayau is still being performed to this date by the Yavusa Maumi in the village of Narocivo on Nayau island, confirming the origin of the title.

Under the subjection and torment of Codro the people of Lakeba continued to live in fear. Codro treated nothing as sacred and claimed anything his eyes would fall upon as his own he would stand and say 'Sikava na waitui' and anyone apposing his claim would be immediately killed and eaten. Tagi valu ko lakeba kina Yavusa Vuanirewa was the cry of the Lakeban People eventually News of this were heard in Bau where Matawalu was staying (this is where the name Matawalu Tikoibau came from).

Matawalu came to Lakeba with his Bauan relatives via Nayau and Nasaqalau. He built up his army from there before moving to Levuka where Codro was residing. They came down following the stream causing the women to say "sa vuvu mai na wai" meaning "the colour of the water has changed" thinking that it could be raining up in the mountains or people coming back from their farms as they didn't realise that Matawalu and his army had arrived. The very first man to die in this battle was standing behind a banana tree. It is said that when Matawalu swung his 'Wau' (War Club) to kill him it cut through the banana tree and decapitated the guard.

The people of Levuka with Codro fled to the sea in their canoes and waited there for Matawalu's army to come and get them. As a sealord Codro shouted "Come and get me, I'm in my territory and if you think you're strong enough come and get me".

Matawalu's army waited and waited for days, Codro with no food started to eat his own people. So when a particular person knows that his day is coming closer he will jump out and start swimming ashore where Matawalu's army were waiting.

Codro was eventually killed and some of his remaining people fled to Aiwa, an island close by and later some went on to Oneata. They were later brought back to Lakeba and are now in Levuka. The club which Matawalu used during this battle is still to this day with his descendent's the Tokatoka Navutoka in Lakeba.

After the slaying of Codro, Matawalu became the Roko Sau in Lakeba. He sent the Katubalevu clan and Nasaqalau people to go to Nayau and bring his elder brother to be the Chief of Lakeba. The reply from Nayau was that "Lakeba is full of trickery, if they come they will get killed".

So he went himself and asked them to come. "You must come and be our chief because your mother is not from there and I will make you Chief". So his elders came to Lakeba bringing the Tui Nayau title with them. As of today The clan Navutoka also known as Koroicumu, named after Matawalu's gallantry in battle, are the only clan that prepares the Yaqona Vakaturaga for the Tui Nayau.
