= Lakeba =

Island in Fiji

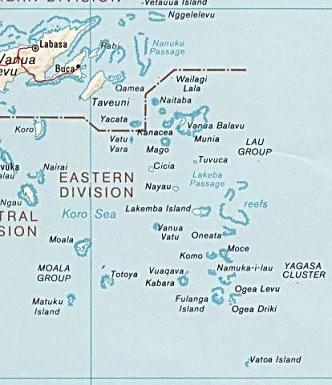
- Map of Fiji

- Location within Fiji

Geography
- Location: Fiji
- Coordinates: 18°13′S 178°47′W
- Archipelago: Lau Islands
- Adjacent to: Koro Sea
- Total islands: 1
- Major islands: 1
- Area: 59.5 km^{2} (23.0 sq mi)
- Length: 8.5 km (5.28 mi)

Administration
- Fiji
- Division: Eastern
- Province: Lau Province
- Largest settlement: Tubou (pop. 500)

Demographics
- Population: 1,557 (2017)
- Pop. density: 35.3/km^{2} (91.4/sq mi)
- Ethnic groups: Native Fijians, Indo-Fijians; other (Asian, Europeans, other Pacific Islander)

Lakeba (pronounced [laˈkemba]) is an island in Fiji’s Southern Lau Archipelago; the provincial capital of Lau is located here. The island is the tenth largest in Fiji, with a land area of nearly 60 square kilometres (23 sq mi). It is fertile and well-watered, and encircled by a 29-kilometre (18 mi) road. Its closest neighbors are Aiwa and Nayau. Separated by deep sea from the latter but only by shallow waters from the former, when sea levels were lower during glacial episodes Lakeba and Aiwa formed one large island.

It has a population of around 2,100 in eight villages, the most important of which is the capital Tubou which lies in the island's south. Near Tubou is the village of Levuka; not to be confused with its namesake – Fiji's old capital – Levuka on Lakeba is home to a fishing tribe whose ancestors came from Bau Island. Another significant village is Nasaqalau, located in the northern part of Lakeba.

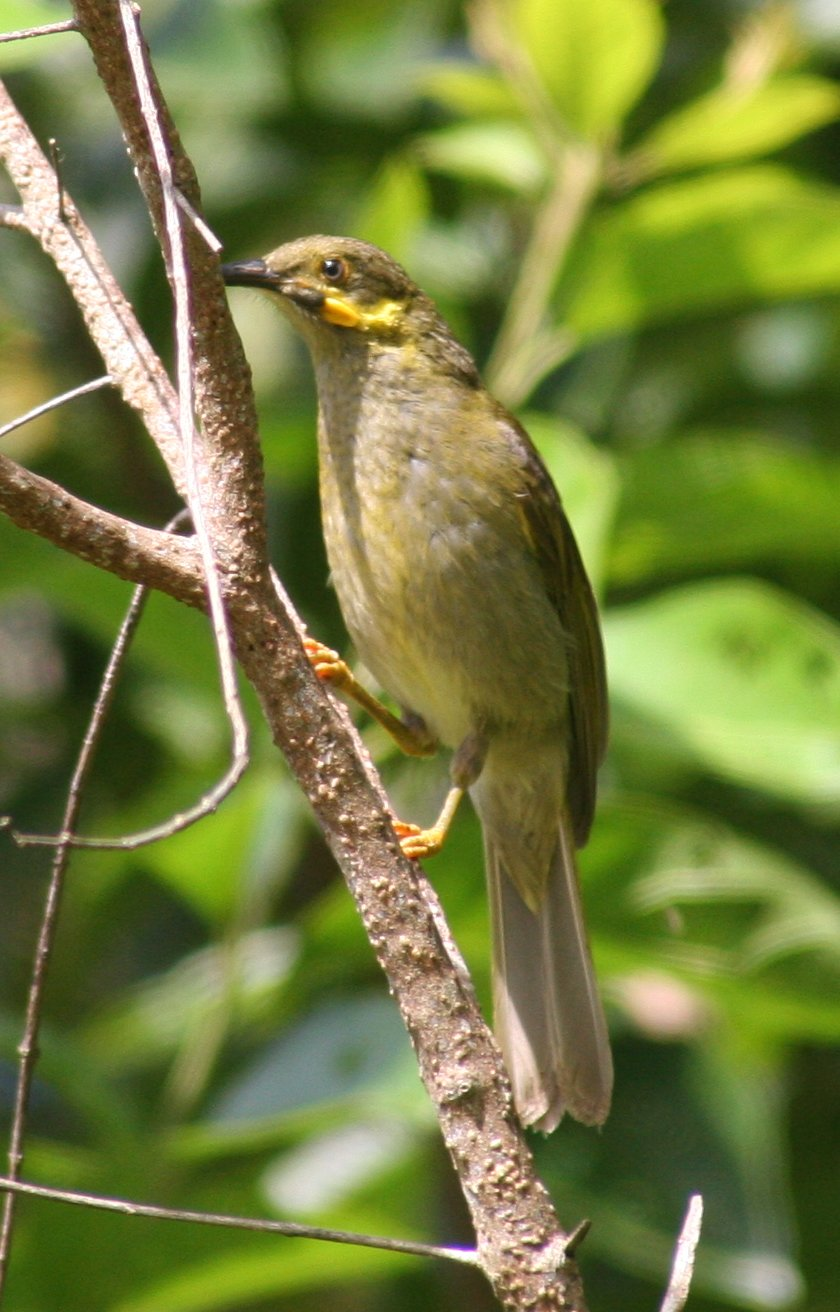
The wattled honeyeaters on Lakeba belong to the large-wattled eastern subspecies Foulehaio carunculatus carunculatus, also found on Samoa, Tonga and Wallis and Futuna

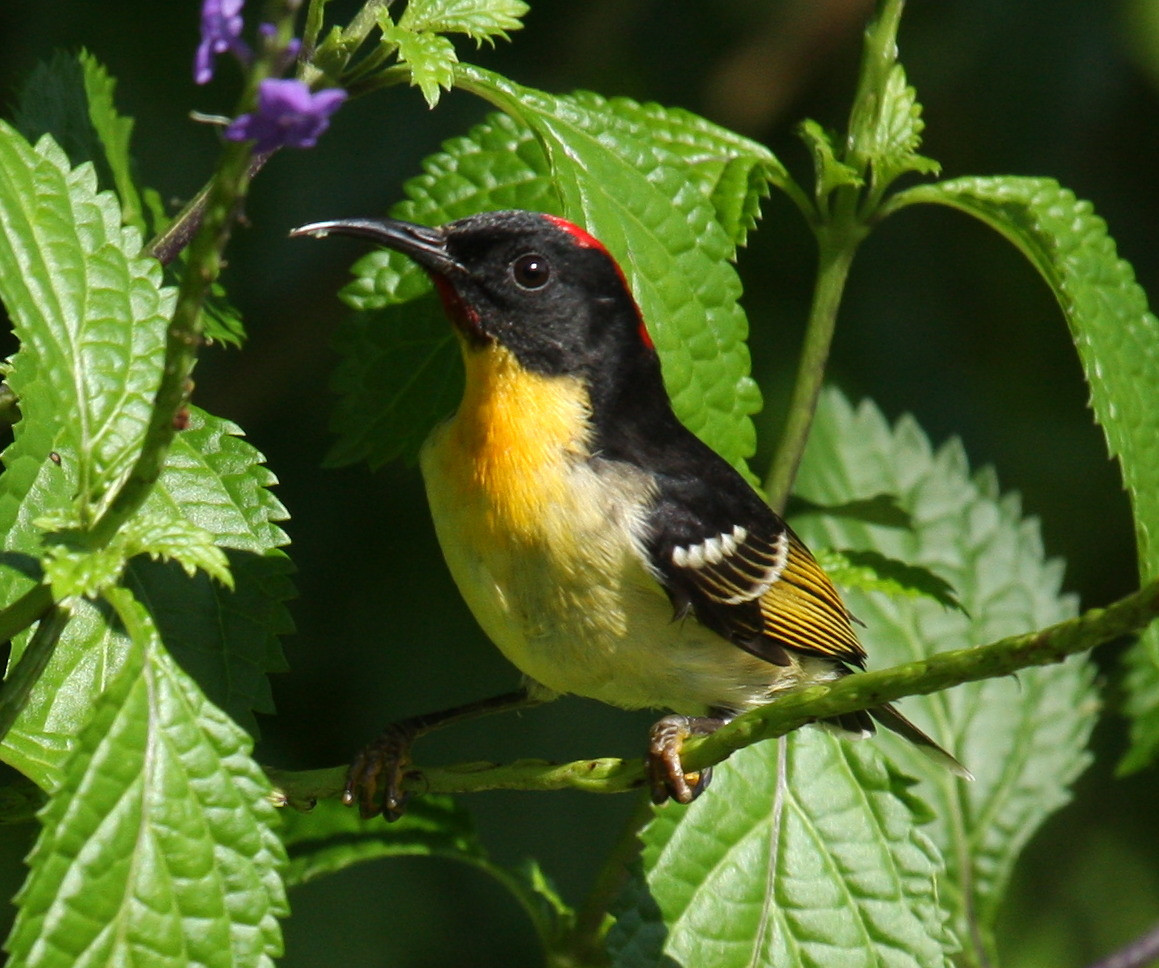
Sulphur-breasted myzomela (Myzomela jugularis)

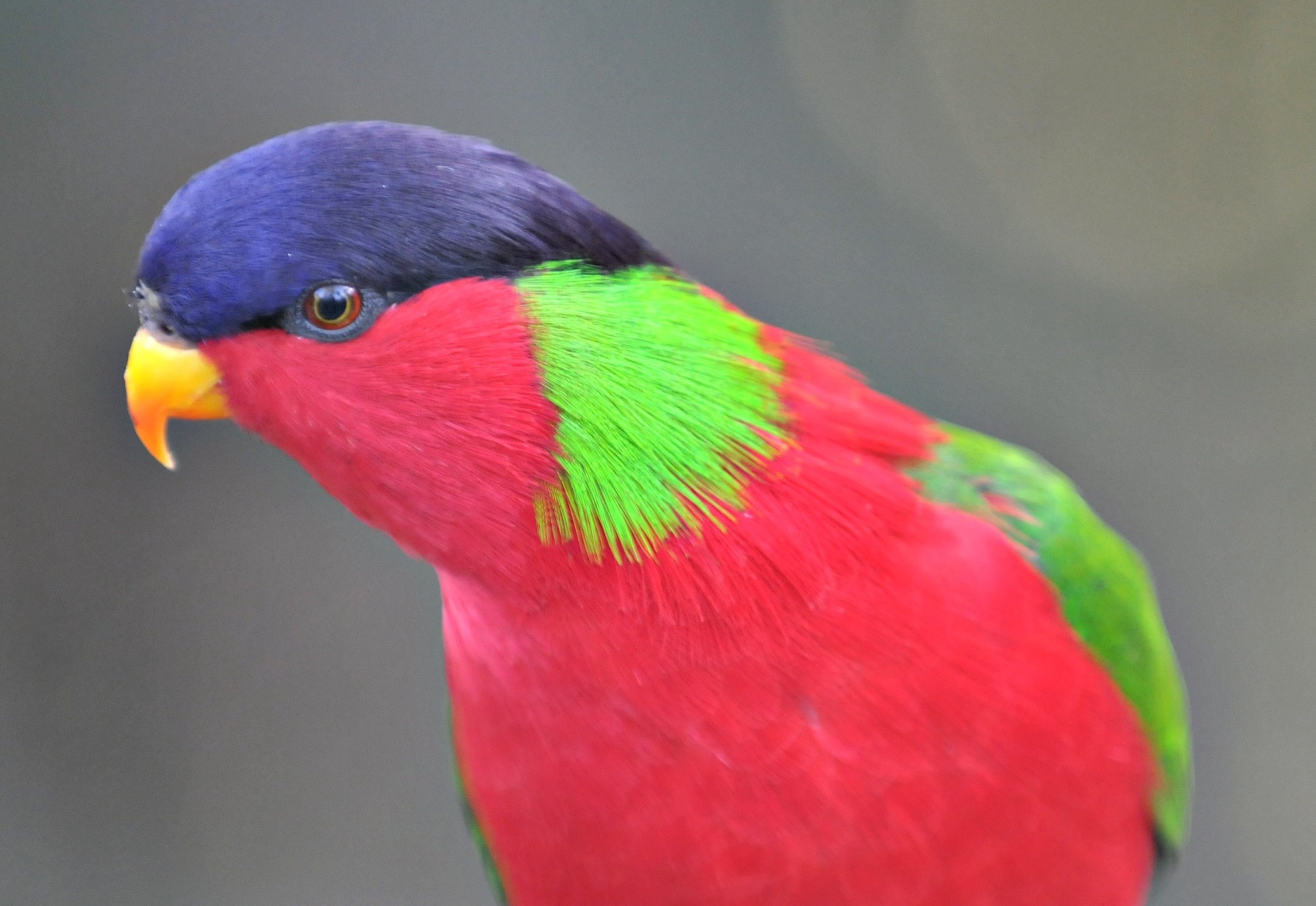
Collared lory (Phigys solitarius) from Lakeba

== Geography ==
Situated at 18.20° South and 178.80° East, Lakeba has an irregular oval shape. About 9 kilometres (5.6 mi) long and 8 kilometres (5.0 mi) wide, it is circumscribed by a total shoreline of 32 kilometres (20 mi). The island, which has a maximum altitude of 219 metres (719 ft), has a core of andesitic volcanic rock of Miocene age, with raised coral rock around it. The limestone lies bare in places, forming karst and – particularly on the north and north-west coasts – cliffs up to 76 metres (249 ft) high; the overall area taken up by bare limestone is about 4% of Lakeba's total land surface. A reforestation programme has seen the planting of Lakeba's hills (formerly partially denuded by deforestation) with Caribbean pine (Pinus caribea) trees.

The climate of Lakeba is generally humid, with a wetter summer and a drier winter. The average annual precipitation is somewhat over 2,000 millimetres (79 in) as measured at Tubou, but average monthly precipitation in the winter months – June, July and August – is only around 80 millimetres (3.1 in), and there can be large differences in rainfall between years.

The village of Nasaqalau is noted for a number of caves, the most famous being Oso Nabukete, also known as the Pregnant Women's Cave. According to legend, a woman attempting to hide her pregnancy will not be able to escape through the mouth of the cave. It is adjoined by Qara Bulu, once used as a prison in times of tribal war. A third cave, Koro ni Vono, was once used as a place of banishment for tuberculosis patients, who were left there to die. Other notable caves include the Tubou Cave, of interest to geologists, and Qara ni Puka where many remains of extinct birds have been found.

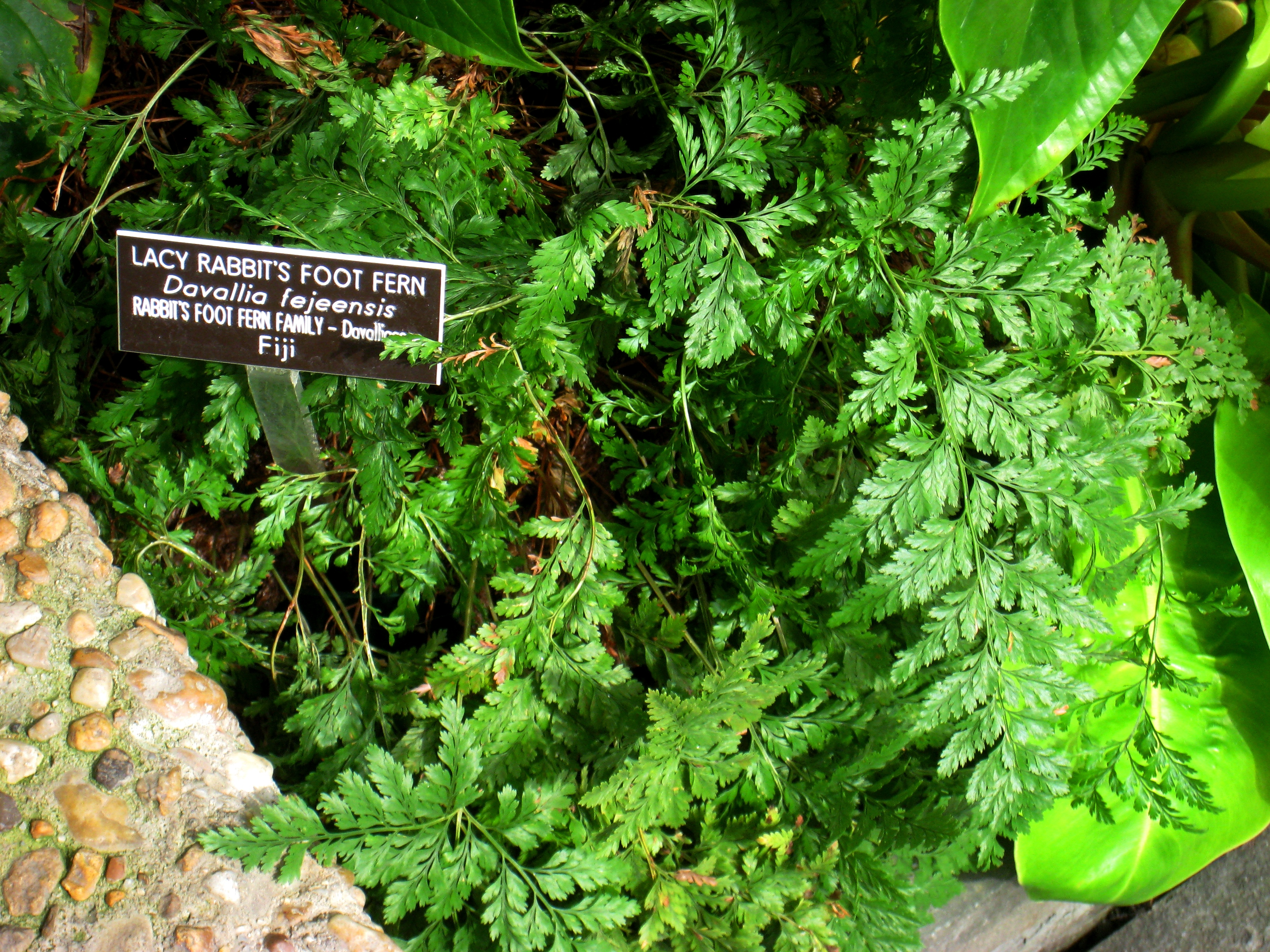
The fern Davallia solida var. fejeensis is endemic to Fiji and grows also on Lakeba

== Climate ==
Climate data for Lakeba (1991–2020 normals)
Month	Jan	Feb	Mar	Apr	May	Jun	Jul	Aug	Sep	Oct	Nov	Dec	Year
Mean daily maximum °C (°F)	30.5 (86.9)	30.8 (87.4)	30.7 (87.3)	29.8 (85.6)	28.5 (83.3)	27.4 (81.3)	26.7 (80.1)	26.8 (80.2)	27.4 (81.3)	28.2 (82.8)	29.3 (84.7)	30.1 (86.2)	28.9 (84.0)
Daily mean °C (°F)	27.3 (81.1)	27.6 (81.7)	27.5 (81.5)	26.9 (80.4)	25.6 (78.1)	24.9 (76.8)	24.0 (75.2)	24.1 (75.4)	24.5 (76.1)	25.2 (77.4)	26.3 (79.3)	27.0 (80.6)	25.9 (78.6)
Mean daily minimum °C (°F)	24.1 (75.4)	24.4 (75.9)	24.4 (75.9)	24.1 (75.4)	22.8 (73.0)	22.3 (72.1)	21.3 (70.3)	21.3 (70.3)	21.7 (71.1)	22.3 (72.1)	23.3 (73.9)	23.9 (75.0)	23 (73)
Average precipitation mm (inches)	262.4 (10.33)	224.8 (8.85)	273.3 (10.76)	230.8 (9.09)	115.5 (4.55)	120.5 (4.74)	89.2 (3.51)	94.8 (3.73)	102.9 (4.05)	112.8 (4.44)	136.8 (5.39)	229.8 (9.05)	1,993.6 (78.49)
Average precipitation days (≥ 1.0 mm)	14.4	14.2	15.7	13.9	10.7	8.0	8.3	8.3	7.9	8.1	9.3	13.5	132.3
Source: World Meteorological Organization

== History and culture ==
Lakeba is known as a chiefly island, being the home island of the chiefly Vuanirewa clan, which is based in Tubou. The head of this clan takes the title of Tui Nayau, and is the Paramount Chief of the Lau Islands. The last Tui Nayau was Ratu Sir Kamisese Mara (1920–2004); he was the first Prime Minister of Fiji and second President of Fiji, and the most durable figure of Fijian politics for more than three decades.

Ratu Mara is buried in the village of Tubou, as are Enele Ma'afu (1816–1881) – a Tongan-Fijian warlord who conquered much of Fiji in the 19th century – and Fiji's first modern statesman Ratu Sir Lala Sukuna (1888–1958).

Lakeba lies on a historical faultline between Fiji and Tonga, and Tongan influence is seen in many aspects of Lakeban culture. Lakeban architecture features rounded houses rather than the square-ended ones elsewhere in Fiji. The Lakeban dialect of Fijian also shows Tongan influence. Tongan hymns are popular in polotu (an evening church service), and Tongan clothing styles are reflected in the mats tied around the waist on formal occasions. Tongan traditional dances called lakalaka are also popular.

Archaeological excavations in the 1990s discovered a massive fortress, built around a thousand years ago. Large enough to house 2,500 people (more than the total population of the island), the fortress is believed to have been built as a bulwark against Tongan invaders.

The inhabitants of Nasaqalau are famous for the ability of one of their clans to call sharks from the sea. This clan originated in the village of Wainikeli on the island of Taveuni.

On Lakeba was born famous chief Delailoa, son of Kalouyalewa, who went on Lakeba.

=== Economy ===
Copra production is the most important economic activity on Lakeba. There is also a coconut mill four kilometres (2.5 mi) outside Tubou. Tourism is of lesser importance in Lakeba than in some other parts of Fiji.

It was major trading partner with Moala as part of a larger inter-island trading network especially for tapa mats.

The island is served by Lakeba Airport.

== Ecology ==
Due to the extensive and long-lasting settlement, the original ecosystem on Lakeba has been strongly altered. Terrestrial mammals, not originally native, have been introduces as livestock or stowaways, and today the island has horses, pigs, cattle, dogs, cats, and Polynesian (Rattus exulans) as well as black rats (R. rattus).

=== Birds ===
Among land birds, bird species disappeared from Lakeba in prehistoric times, probably after the upland forests were largely cleared away; introduced rats as well as hunting probably also contributed to their demise. Others managed to adapt to the alteration of habitat by humans, though they are generally not as common as on Aiwa where there has been no significant deforestation. For the most part, the avifauna of Lakeba is more similar to that of Samoa and Tonga than to that of the main group of Fiji. Quite commonly seen are the white-rumped swiftlet (Collocalia spodiopygia), Polynesian starling, (Aplonis tabuensis, either the West Fijian subspecies vitiensis or the subspecies tabuensis from the southern Lau group and Tonga), Vanikoro flycatcher (Myiagra vanikorensis), and the slaty monarch (Mayrornis lessoni) which is endemic to Fiji. Two honeyeaters, the endemic orange-breasted myzomela (Myzomela jugularis) and the widespread eastern wattled honeyeater (Foulehaio carunculatus carunculatus), have adapted well to human settlement and are rather common in the coconut plantations. The collared lory (Phigys solitarius), endemic to Fiji in modern times, also frequents this habitat, but is a rather rare species on Lakeba.

At least three species formerly found on Lakeba are now completely extinct: the Lakeba imperial pigeon (Ducula lakeba) might also have occurred on Viti Levu and perhaps on the Tongan islands of ʻEua, Foa and Lifuka. If so, it probably was generally widespread in western Polynesia, but until now it is only known with certainty from Lakeba and Aiwa. A hitherto undescribed Gallirallus rail also inhabited Lakeba and Aiwa in the past; as this bird was flightless it represents an endemic species. The consumed scrubfowl (Megapodius alimentum), a species rather widely distributed throughout Fiji and Tonga, also occurred on Lakeba and Aiwa in the past; as scrubfowl were widely transported across islands by settlers, this species might have been brought here by humans, but altogether this is not too likely.

However, on Aiwa a single bone was found, probably referrable either to the Viti Levu scrubfowl (M. amissus) or the pile-builder megapode (M. molistructor); the latter species occurred on Tonga and New Caledonia, while the former, which lived on Viti Levu and perhaps Kadavu of the western group of Fiji, possibly survived to modern times. Considering that only one bone was found and that M. alimentum was numerous on Lakeba and presumably also Aiwa, it may well be that the second Megapodius species was indeed imported as food by Polynesians and never had a self-sustaining population; in that regard it may be noted that unlike M. alimentum, M. amissus was a weak flier or even flightless. Parrot bones found on Lakeba might be of the Oceanic eclectus parrot (Eclectus infectus); biogeography suggests that this species was formerly native to at least some islands in Fiji, as it occurred on Tonga to the east and Vanuatu to the west. In addition, there remains a batch of songbird bones from several species that have not been identified; these might be of birds not found on Lakeba anymore but it is not too likely that they contain any entirely extinct forms.

Also found on Aiwa was a single bone of a Porzana rail. Apparently this was yet another distinct species, and if so it is likely to have occurred on Lakeba too. But until more material turns up and is studied, nothing can be said with certainty, particularly in respect of the fact that the white-browed crake (P. cinerea) and the spotless crake (P. tabuensis) formerly occurred on Lakeba. Finally, a single bone of the striated heron (Butorides striata) was found on Lakeba; the species does not occur there today, but unless more bones are found it is not sure that it had a self-sustaining population on this island rather than being merely an occasional visitor. Peale's imperial pigeon (Ducula latrans), the Southwest Pacific peregrine falcon (Falco peregrinus nesiotes) and the Fiji shrikebill (Clytorhynchus vitiensis) breed on much smaller Aiwa but not on Lakeba; though no bones of these species have been found here to date, it is likely that they formerly occurred on Lakeba too.

=== Plants ===
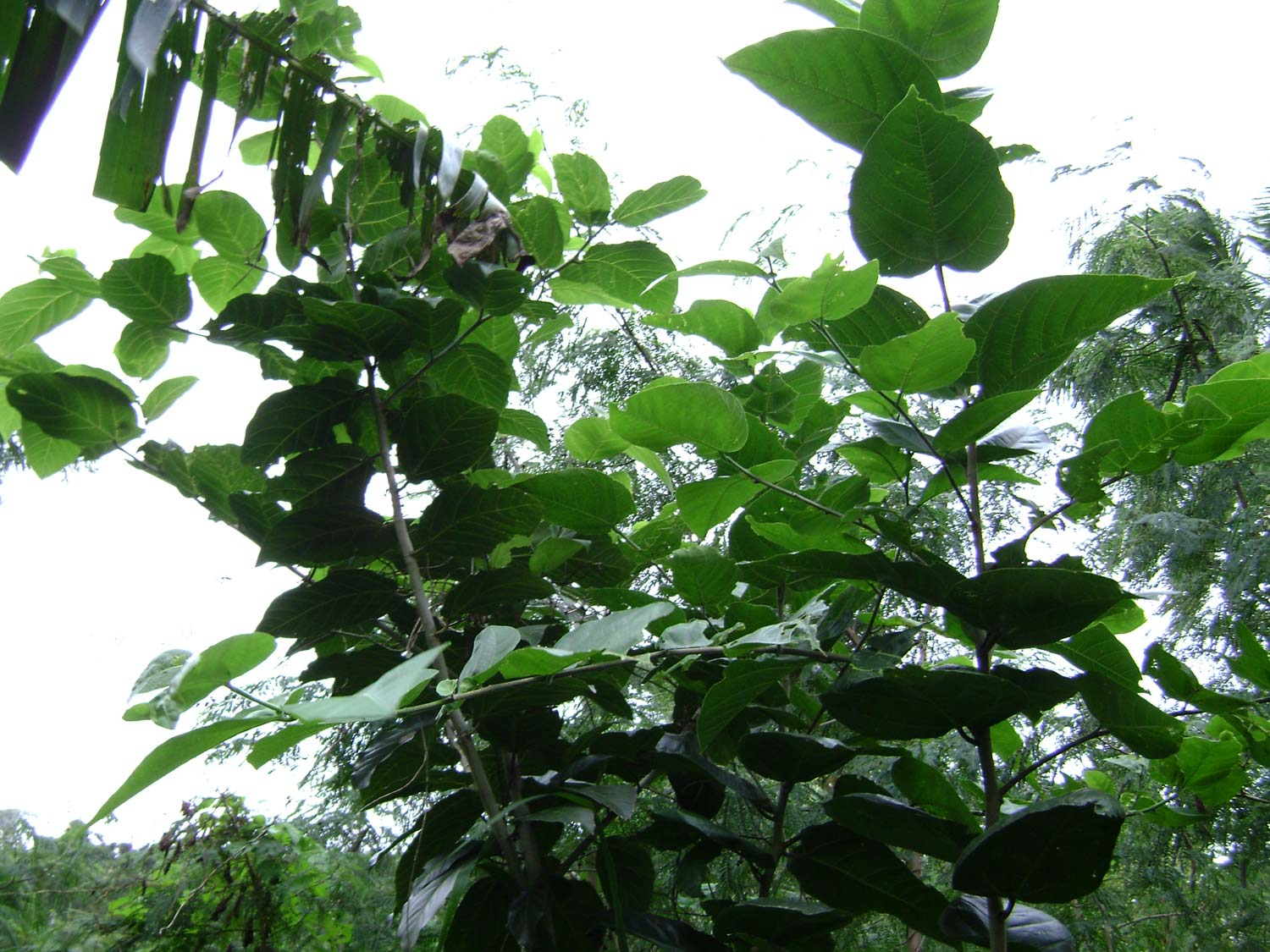
The small tree Grewia crenata can be found in Lakeba's forests

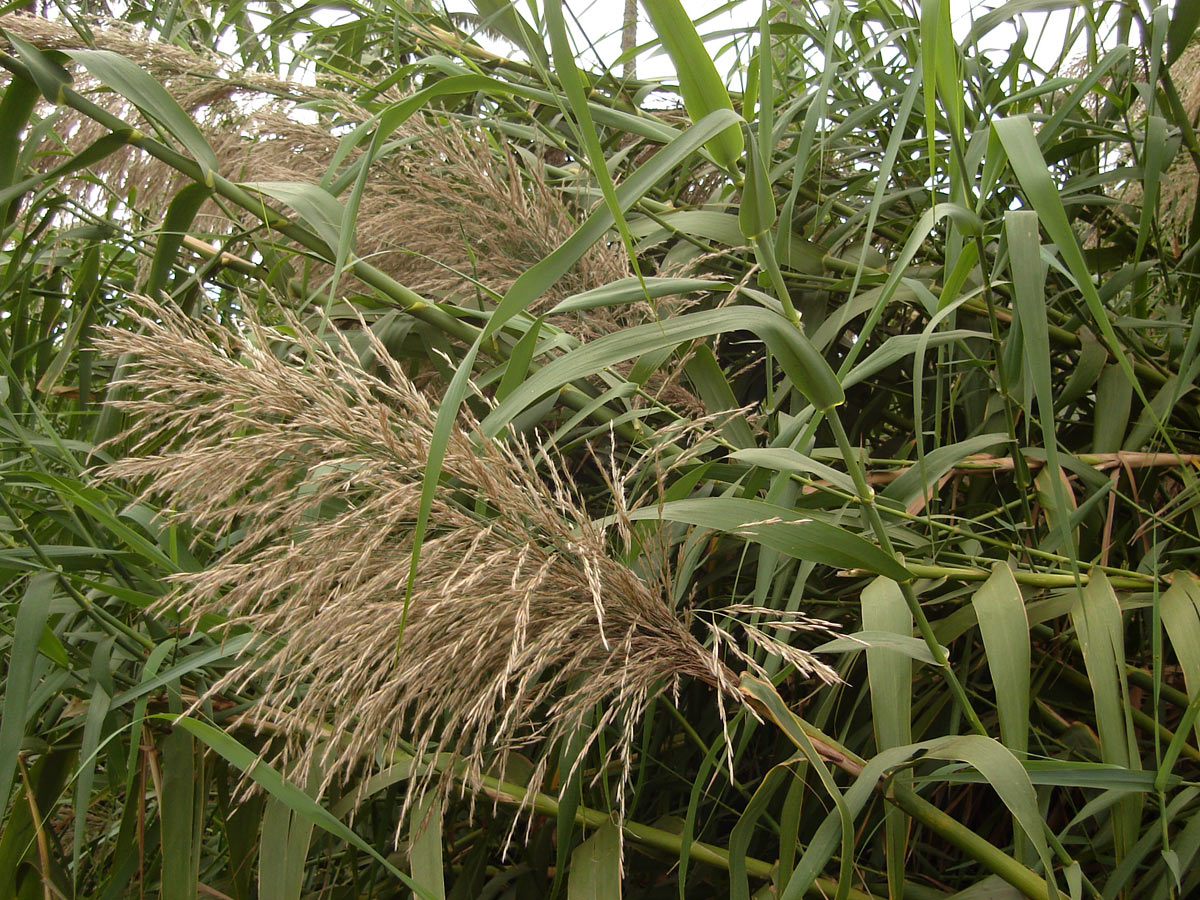
Miscanthus floridulus, a native grass of Lakeba, forms thickets in the talasiga

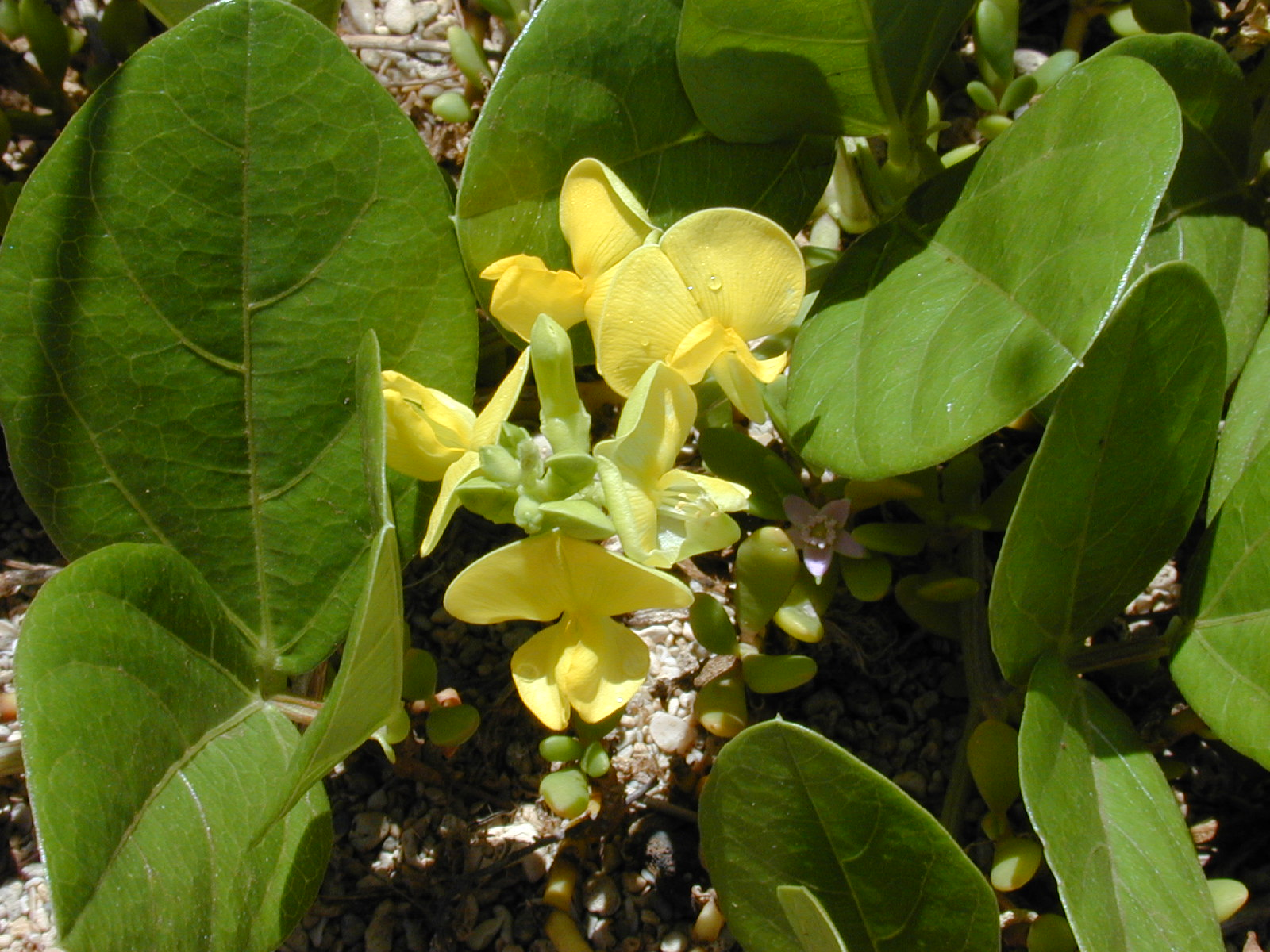
Vigna marina, a native legume of Lakeba that grows abundantly near the sea

The former upland forest was largely cleared after the initial settlement to make room for agriculture; only about 5 km^{2} (1.9 sq mi) of it remain. A total 40% of Lakeba's surface is used for cultivation of Caribbean pine (Pinus caribaea), the rare cycad ("sago palm") Cycas seemannii, coconut palms (Cocos nucifera) and other crops. The remaining vegetation of Lakeba is dominated by dicots; it can be classified as follows, progressing from the peak to the shore:

- Upland forest on volcanic soil. Little remains today, mostly in ravines and on ridges. Contains such species as Alyxia stellata, Alphitonia zizyphoides, Barringtonia edulis, Dysoxylum richii, Ficus scabra, Grewia crenata, Micromelum minutum, Pittosporum arborescens, Vavaea amicorum, and Geissois ternata which is only found on volcanic soils.
- talasiga grassland and scrub. This is a plant community that contains mainly herbaceous and small woody species; it grows where forest had been cleared away in the past. In locations that have suffered much erosion it persists; elsewhere it is gradually being replaced with forest again. Dominant plant species are Dicranopteris linearis, Hopseed (Dodonaea viscosa), Pandanus tectorius and Pteridium esculentum; grasses include Bothriochloa bladhii, Brachiaria subquadripara, Southern Sandbur (Cenchrus echinatus), Indian Goosegrass (Eleusine indica), Eragrostis scabriflora, Eriochloa procera, Imperata conferta, Miscanthus floridulus, Paspalum conjugatum, P. orbiculare, Pennisetum polystachion and Themeda quadrivalvis. Regenerating forest is initially dominated by Cyclophyllum barbatum, Geissois ternata, Geniostoma rupestre, Leucosyke corymbulosa, Maesa tabacifolia and Myristica gillespieana.
- Upland forest on calcitic soil. This is essentially secondary forest in various stages of succession, but rich in Fijian endemics. Dominated by Alphitonia zizyphoides, Buchanania vitiensis, Dysoxylum richii, D. tenuiflorum, Maniltoa floribunda, Melicope cucullata and Planchonella tahitensis.
- Wetlands vegetation. Most freshwater wetland on Lakeba is used for taro cultivation. Otherwise, dominant plants include Ludwigia octovalvis and Mikania micrantha.
- Lowland swamp forest. Dominated by Inocarpus fagifer.
- Coastal forest. Characterized by Diospyros elliptica, D. samoensis, Planchonella tahitensis, Syzygium richii and Xylosma simulans.
- Mangrove forest. Mangroves are widespread on the eastern coast of Lakeba, comprising about 7% of the island's total area. Dominant plant species are black mangrove (Bruguiera gymnorhiza) landwards, and red mangrove (Rhizophora mangle), spotted mangrove (R. stylosa) and their sterile hybrid R. × selala seawards.
- Littoral forest. These trees are able to withstand seawater and most are even dispersed by the sea; they grow in a narrow strip along the beach. Dominant plants are sea poison tree (Barringtonia asiatica), ballnut (Calophyllum inophyllum), Hernandia nymphaeifolia, beach hibiscus (Hibiscus tiliaceus), Phaleria disperma and sea almond (Terminalia catappa).
- Littoral scrub. The low-lying and mainly herbaceous beach vegetation. Dominated by oceanblue morning glory (Ipomoea indica), white-flowered beach morning glory (I. littoralis), beach morning glory (I. pes-caprae), Pandanus tectorius, Paspalum vaginatum, Scaevola taccada and Vigna marina.

Plants found on Lakeba that are endemic to Fiji are Alangium vitiense, Buchanania vitiensis, Connarus pickeringii, Davallia solida var. fejeensis, Diospyros vitiensis var. longisepala, Dysoxylum tenuiflorum, Elatostema tenellum, Eragrostis scabriflora, Ficus fulvo-pilosa, Ficus masonii, Geissois ternata, Geniostoma uninervium, Glochidion seemannii, Homalium pallidum, Maniltoa floribunda, Melicope cucullata, Melochia vitiensis, Myristica gillespieana, Phaleria pubiflora, Polyalthia laddiana and Psychotria cf. pickeringii. Plants tentatively identified as the Fijian endemics Barringtonia seaturae, Citronella vitiensis, Cyathocalyx insularis and Elaeocarpus storckii grow on Lakeba, but whether it is really these species requires confirmation.

None of the described endemic species occurs exclusively on this island, but there is an unidentified Syzygium similar to Syzygium gracilipes and another member of this genus that almost certainly is a hitherto unknown species. These might indeed be found on Lakeba only.

Interesting non-endemic plants found on Lakeba are the endangered Aglaia saltatorum and the rare (though not endangered) Burckella richii. In 1999-2001 the first Fijian record of Macropiper timothianum outside the large northwestern islands was made on Lakeba, as well as the first records for Fiji of Suicide Tree (Cerbera odollam) and Garuga floribunda. Whether Canarium vanikoroense, otherwise known in Fiji only from the large islands, occurs on Lakeba remains to be verified.
