= Lau Islands =

Archipelago of eastern Fiji

Native name: Eastern Archipelago
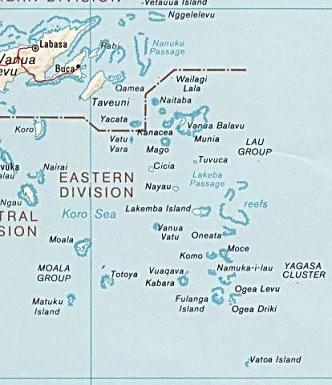
- The Lau Islands
- Interactive map of Lau Islands

Geography
- Location: South Pacific Ocean
- Coordinates: 18.4307491°S 179.8187043°W
- Adjacent to: Koro Sea
- Total islands: ca. 60
- Major islands: Vanua Balavu. Cicia, Lakeba, Moala
- Area: 487 km^{2} (188 sq mi)
- Length: 80 km (50 mi)
- Highest elevation: 600 m (2000 ft)

Administration
- Fiji
- Division: Eastern Division
- Province: Lau

Demographics
- Population: 10,683 (2007)

Additional information
- Time zone: FJT (UTC+12)
  - Summer (DST): FJST (UTC+13)

Location of the Lau Islands in the Pacific Ocean

The Lau Islands (also called the Lau Group, the Eastern Group, the Eastern Archipelago) of Fiji are situated in the southern Pacific Ocean, just east of the Koro Sea. Of this chain of about sixty islands and islets, about thirty are inhabited. The Lau Group covers a land area of 188 square miles (487 square km), and had a population of 10,683 at the most recent census in 2007. While most of the northern Lau Group are high islands of volcanic origin, those of the south are mostly carbonate low islands.

Administratively the islands belong to Lau Province.

== History ==
The British explorer James Cook reached Vatoa in 1774. By the time of the discovery of the Ono Group in 1820, the Lau archipelago was the most mapped area of Fiji.

Political unity came late to the Lau Islands. Historically, they comprised three territories: the Northern Lau Islands, the Southern Lau Islands, and the Moala Islands. Around 1855, the renegade Tongan prince Enele Ma'afu with the help of Tui Nayau’s army, conquered the region and established a unified administration. Tui Nayau then bestowed the title Tui Lau, or King of Lau, to Ma’afu, promulgated a constitution and encouraged the establishment of Christian missions. The first missionaries had arrived at Lakeba in 1830, but had been expelled. The Tui Nayau, who had been the nominal overlord of the Lau Islands, became subject to Ma'afu.

The Tui Nayau and Tui Lau titles came into personal union in 1969. Ratu Sir Kamisese Mara, who had already been bestowed the title of Tui Lau in 1963 by the Vuanirewa Clan on the approval of his father Ratu Tevita Uluilakeba II (the reigning Tui Nayau during that time), was also installed as Tui Nayau following the death of Ratu Tevita Uluilakeba II in 1966. The title Tui Lau was left vacant from his uncle, Ratu Sir Lala Sukuna, in 1958 as referenced in Mara, The Pacific Way Paper. The installation of the Tui Nayau takes place in Narocivo Maumi on the island of Nayau, by the Vunirewa clan elders or the Matua I Tui Nayau. The Tui Nayau can also be installed by the Masi Ni Vanua o Nayau in the island of Nayau.

The Northern Lau Islands, which extended as far south as Tuvuca, were under the overlordship of Taveuni and paid tribute to the Tui Cakau (Paramount Chief of Cakaudrove). In 1855, however, Ma'afu & Tui Nayau gained sovereignty over Northern Lau, establishing Lomaloma, on Vanua Balavu, as Ma”afu’s capital.

The Southern Lau Islands extended from Ono-i-Lau, in the far south, to as far north as Cicia. They were the traditional chiefdom of the Tui Nayau, but with proper consultation between Ma'afu & Tui Nayau in the 1850s, united them to the Lau Province.

The Moala Islands had closer affiliation with Bau Island and Lomaiviti than with Lau, but Ma'afu & Tui Nayau’s conquest united them with the Lau Islands. They have remained administratively a part of the Lau Province ever since.

== Culture and economy ==
Since they lie between Melanesian Fiji and Polynesian Tonga, the Lau Islands are a meeting point of the two cultural spheres. Lauan villages remain very traditional, and the islands' inhabitants are renowned for their wood carving and masi paintings. Lakeba especially was a traditional meeting place between Tongans and Fijians. The south-east trade winds allowed sailors to travel from Tonga to Fiji, but much harder to return. The Lau Island culture became more Fijian rather than Polynesian beginning around 500 BC. However, Tongan influence can still be found in names, language, food, and architecture. Unlike the square-shaped ends characterizing most houses elsewhere in Fiji, Lauan houses tend to be rounded, following the Tongan practice.

In early July 2014, Tonga's Lands Minister, Lord Maʻafu Tukuiʻaulahi, revealed a proposal for Tonga to give the disputed Minerva Reefs to Fiji in exchange for the Lau Group. At the time that news of the proposal first broke, it had not yet been discussed with the Lau Provincial Council. Many Lauans have Tongan ancestors and some Tongans have Lauan ancestors; Tonga's Lands Minister is named after Enele Ma'afu, the Tongan Prince who originally claimed parts of Lau for Tonga. Historically, the Minerva Reefs have been part of the fishing grounds belonging to the people of Ono-i-Lau, an island in the Lau Group.

Just off the island of Vanua Balavu at Lomaloma was the Yanuyanu Island Resort, built to encourage tourism in what has been a less accessible area of Fiji, but the small resort failed almost immediately and has been abandoned since the year 2000. An airstrip is located off Malaka village and a port is also located on Vanua Balavu, at Lomaloma. There are guest houses on Vanua Balavu and on Lakeba, the other principal island.

The Lau Islands are the centre of the game of Cricket in Fiji. Cricket is the most popular team sport in Lau, unlike the rest of the country where Rugby and Association Football are preferred. The national team is invariably dominated by Lauan players.

== Environment ==
Conservation work in the Lau Islands has included seagrass research and related ecosystem activities associated with Conservation International Fiji. The programme also supported food-security recovery work in the islands after Cyclone Rae in 2025.

== Notable Lauans ==
The Lau Islands' most famous son is the late Ratu Sir Kamisese Mara (1920-2004), the Tui Lau, Tui Nayau, Sau ni Vanua (hereditary Paramount Chief of the Lau Islands) and the founding father of modern Fiji who was Prime Minister for most of the period between 1967 and 1992, and President from 1993 to 2000. Other noted Lauans include Ratu Sir Lala Sukuna (1898-1958), who forged embryonic constitutional institutions for Fiji in the years that preceded independence. Other notable Lauans include:

- Politicians: Jonati Mavoa held many ministerial portfolios in the early part of Fiji's transition to self-government, Charles Walker who held several portfolios in the Alliance government before becoming a Diplomat, Nelson Delailomaloma who was Permanent Secretary of Education and Minister in the Interim Government, former Prime Minister Laisenia Qarase, former Attorney-General Qoriniasi Bale, former Minister of Education Filipe Bole, Ambassador to China Esala Teleni, and former Cabinet Minister Lavenia Padarath. Current First Lady Adi Koila Nailatikau is also Lauan, being the daughter of Ratu Sir Kamisese Mara.
- Bureaucrats: Include former permanent secretaries Marika Tukituku, Solomone Makasiale, Joji Kotobalavu, Solomone Sila and current permanent secretary Jale Fotofili First Fijian Chief Justice (Sir Timoci Tuivaga), First Fijian President of Methodist church Setareki Tuilovoni, Kacimaiwai, Epeli - former High Commissioner to Australia, former Permanent Secretary for Education and first Fijian Principal appointed to Queen Victoria School.
- Sports: Cricket: I. L. Bula, Eroni Loganimoce, Peni Dakainivanua, Taniela Naulivou, Uraia Sorovakatini Boxing: Sunia Cama, Kamisese Vaubula, Temo Kolitapa, Eroni Covutimabula Loganimoce Rugby: Joeli Veitayaki, Sunia Koto, Osea Kolinisau, Netani Talei, Sisa Koyamaibole, Asaeli Tikoirotuma, Metuisela Talebula, Eroni Mawi, Akapusi Qera, Jikoibau Matawalu, Sefa Naivalu, Tevita Cavubati, Bill Cavubati, Deryck Thomas Sowani, Kameli Ratuvou, Iliesa Keresoni, Api Naikatini, Apisai Tauyavuca, Henry Qiodravu
- Youth leaders: Roko Jonetani (Pita) Waqavonovono, Ratu Jone Liwaki Uluilakeba, Tupou Veiogo, Ratu Wiliame Gucake and Jackie Koroivulaono.

== See also ==
- Lau Basin
- Lau Ridge
