= Bau (village) =

- Village
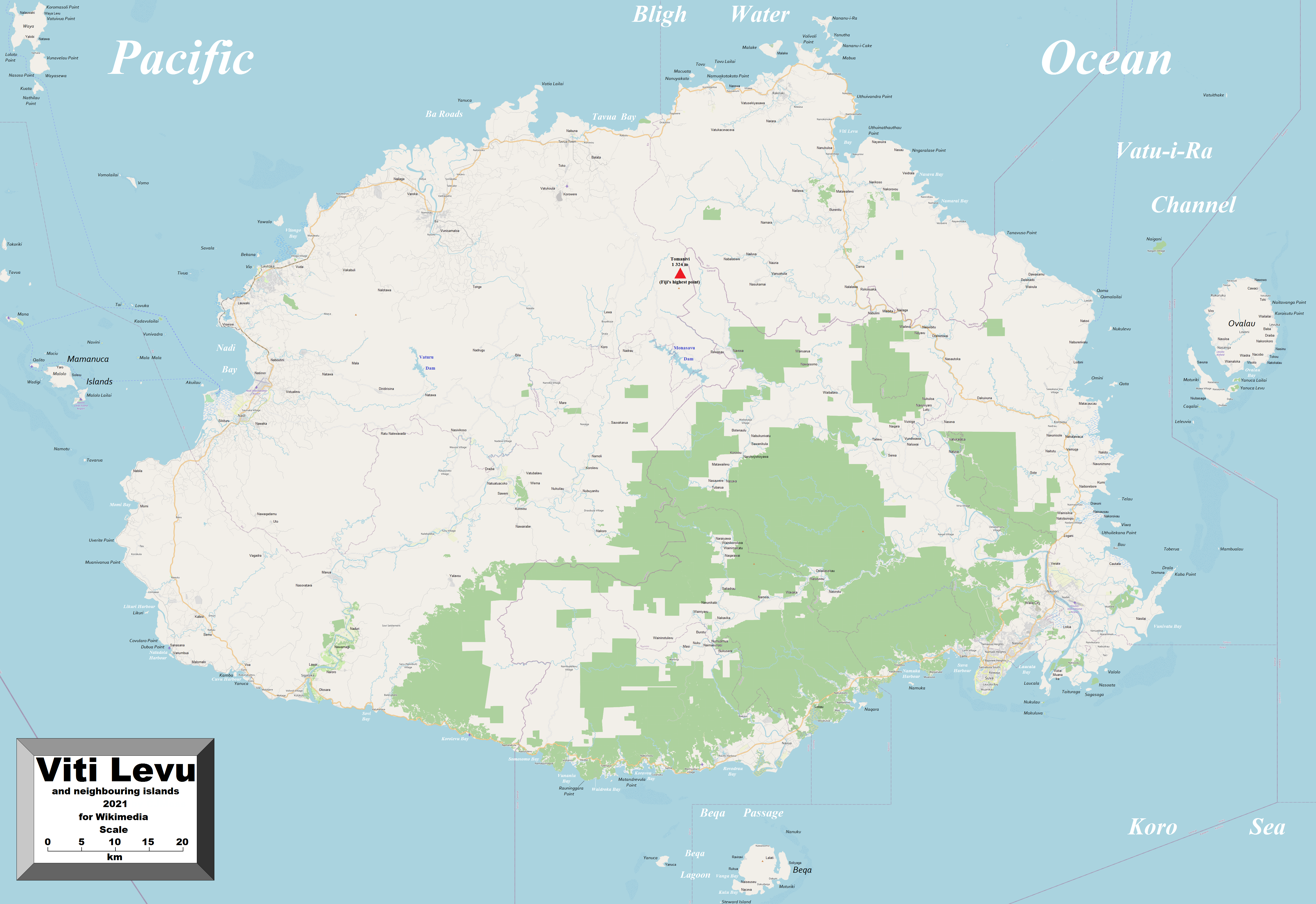
- Viti Levu with Bau Island off the east coast

- Location in Fiji
- Country: Fiji
- Island: Bau
- Division: Central Division
- Province: Tailevu
- Time zone: UTC+12

Bau (Fijian pronunciation: [mbɔu̯]) is the main village on Bau Island, Fiji. Once integral to the power and economy of the chiefly village, the villages of Lasakau (traditional fishermen) and Soso (traditional carpenters) are also located on the twenty-two acre island which became the centre of traditional power throughout the Fiji Islands in the nineteenth century.

Because of its historic significance, in 1968 the Leader of the Opposition, A. D. Patel proposed setting aside funds to preserve the island. The main historic buildings in the village are the Ratu Seru Cakobau Church, the Vatanitawake temple and the Ulu ni Vuaka meeting house situated around the village green or rara. These buildings were all upgraded for the visit of Queen Elizabeth II in 1982, where she opened the Great Council of Chiefs meeting in Bau village.

During her visit, Queen Elizabeth conferred on the Vunivalu and Governor General Ratu Sir George Cakobau a rare and exclusive honour of the Royal Victorian Chain displaying her affection for the high chief of Bau and for the people of Fiji. The village is the traditional home of the Vunivalu Tui Kaba - the paramount chief of the traditional Kubuna Confederacy and the Roko Tui Bau of the Vusaratu clan. Other clans of Bau village are the Vusaradave (traditional warriors), Tunitoga (Vunivalu's heralds) and Masau (Roko Tui Bau's heralds).

The Vunivalu's residence named Mataiweilagi is situated on the south east shore front of the village. Other chiefly residences that remain in the village are Naicobocobo, Naisogolaca, Muaidule, Nadamele, and 'Qaranikula'. The district school, the Methodist Division missionary's residence and the chiefly mausoleum is situated on the knoll. The tiny islet of Nailusi sits approximately fifty meters from the north eastern end of Bau off Muaidule. Today, because of the village's growing population and the restrictive dwelling space on the island, many Bauan families live as a community at Taro settlement opposite the island on the Viti Levu coast, next to the main Nausori-Bau road.

== Notable people ==
Many Bauan villagers since Seru Epenisa Cakobau - the leading Fijian chief who ceded Fiji to the United Kingdom - have played significant roles in Fiji's history. They include Ratu Epeli Nailatikau, Ratu Timoci Tavanavanua, Ratu Joni Madraiwiwi, Ratu Sir Lala Sukuna, Ratu Penaia Kadavulevu, Ratu Popi Seniloli, Ratu Edward Cakobau, Ratu Deve Toganivalu (Snr), Ratu Tiale Vuiyasawa, Ratu Dr. Jione Atonio Rabici Doviverata and Ratu Sir George Cakobau and Ratu Joni Madraiwiwi I. Among white residents, the Swedish beachcomber Charlie Savage, who lived there 1808–13, is the most important.
