= Alifereti Finau Ulugalala =

Ratu Alifereti Finau (1869 – 3 April 1934) was the eleventh Sau ni Vanua of Lau and the fifth Tui Nayau. He was a member of the noble household Matailakeba.

== Biography ==
Ratu Finau was born in 1869, the son of Ratu Tevita Uluilakeba II and Adi Asenaca Kakua Vuikaba, daughter of the Vunivalu of Bau and self-styled King of Fiji, Ratu Seru Epenisa Cakobau. He married Adi Ateca Moceiwaqa, the daughter of Ratu Epeli Nailatikau I, the Vunivalu of Bau in 1896, and eldest son of Ratu Seru Epenisa Cakobau.

His father was in line to become the next Tui Nayau, but died before the title was passed on. As Ratu Finau was still a minor when the title was passed, it instead passed to his granduncle Ratu Eroni Loganimoce, Roko Taliai Tupou's son.

In 1898 with the death of Ratu Eroni Loganimoce, Ratu Penaia Kadavulevu, Vunivalu of Bau, went to Lau and made Ratu Finau as Sau ni Vanua and Tui Nayau ahead of Ratu Salesi Kinikinilau (Ratu Eroni's nephew and Ratu Finau's rival for the title).

It is assumed that a possible reason for Ratu Kadavulevu's eventual selection was due to the notion of dynastic extensions of power, as Ratu Finau was not only a first cousin but also married to his sister, Adi Ateca Moceiwaqa. Adi Moce as she is commonly referred to, is recorded to have been influential in introducing Bauan standards, manners and protocols in Lakeba which in time became dominant. This marriage between first cousins was not uncommon in Fijian families at the time. (Adi Moce & Ratu Kadavulevu's father was Ratu Epeli Nailatikau I, eldest son of Ratu Cakobau; Ratu Finau's mother was another of Cakobau's daughters Adi Asenaca Kakua).

Ratu Finau was responsible and instrumental in promoting his nephew's Ratu Lala Sukuna's education overseas. It is recorded that he levied one ton of copra from every adult male in Lau in order to fund Ratu Sukuna's education. His intention for this was that he saw the need to groom a powerful and articulate indigenous spokesman in government and in the councils of the nation to combat the increasing aggressive promotion of their own interests by Indians and Europeans. In time his nephew Ratu Sukuna would realise his intentions by becoming one of the most respected leaders of modern Fiji.

He founded the first school Lau Provincial School in Tubou, Lakeba in 1908, which recruited staff from the United Kingdom. Some early pioneering teachers at this school included the ethnographer and anthropologist Arthur Maurice Hocart.

Ratu Finau died in Tubou on 3 April 1934 at the age of 65 and was succeeded by his son, Ratu Tevita Uluilakeba III
