= Epeli =

Epeli is a Fijian male given name. Notable people with this name include:

- Epeli Baleibau (born 1972), Fijian athlete
- Epeli Ganilau (born 1951), Fijian military officer and politician
- Epeli Hauʻofa (1939–2009), Tongan and Fijian writer and anthropologist
- Epeli Kanakana (died 2010), Fijian chief
- Epeli Lairoti (born 1995), Fijian football player
- Epeli Loaniceva (born 1992), Fijian football player
- Epeli Nailatikau (born 1941), Fijian chief
- Epeli Nailatikau I (1842–1901), Fijian Paramount Chief
- Epeli Naituivau (born 1962), Fijian rugby union player
- Epeli Niudamu, Fijian Chief, soldier, and political leader
- Epeli Qaraninamu Nailatikau (born 1942), Fijian medical doctor and political leader
- Epeli Rabua (born 1998), Fijian swimmer
- Epeli Rakai (born 1961), Fijian rugby union player
- Epeli Ruivadra (rugby union, born 1977) (born 1977), Fijian rugby union player
- Epeli Saukuru (born 1988), Fijian football player
