= Mara Kapaiwai =

Fijian noble

Kapaiwai Tuimacilai Mara (born between 1815 and 1820 – 6 August 1859), chiefly seafarer, and descendant of the Vunivalu of Bau.

Ratu Mara's father was Ratu Vuibureta (half brother of Ratu Tanoa Visawaqa) of Bau, who was the son of Ratu Banuve, Vunivalu of Bau. He was thus not only a potential contender for the title of Vunivalu of Bau, but vasulevu to Tubou, from which came many of the great canoes on which Bau's naval might rested. His mother was Roko Mere Veisaca of Tubou, Lakeba in Lau.

Ratu Mara was married to Adi Loaloakubou, daughter of Ratu Tanoa Visawaqa and Adi Talatoka of Somosomo. They had one son, Ratu Joni Madraiwiwi I, who became the father of Ratu Sir Lala Sukuna and others.

His grandmother was Adi Talatoka, who was the daughter of Ratu Yavala (Tui Cakau) of Somosomo and Adi Levulevu of the Roko Tui Bau Royal Court. Adi Levulevu and Adi Savusavu (Ratu Cakobau's mother) were sisters.

== Ratu Mara's Legacy ==
Ratu Mara won fame by sailing his canoe to Tonga, an act of unprecedented audacity for a Fijian seafarer. Returning to Fiji with Ma'afu in 1847, he finally fell out with Ratu Cakobau and was forced to take refuge with Qaraniqio of Rewa. He allied with him and other chiefs, including Koroi Ravulo of Vusaradave, Tui Levuka and Tavo of Wainikelei in Moala, whoom he used his influence to support his ventures among his kin such as the Wairiki War, and the Highland War in a formidable coalition dedicated to the destruction of Ratu Cakobau.

He waged guerilla campaigns against Ratu Cakobau until 1859 when he was gulled into surrendering himself in Bau, only to be hanged the next day by order of his cousin, Ratu Cakobau.

The wounds caused by the hanging of Ratu Mara were secretly nursed by his descendants, but it eventually surfaced during the time of his grandson, Ratu Sir Lala Sukuna when he removed himself and his younger brother, Ratu Tiale Vuiyasawa and his sisters away from the Tui Kaba Registration of Births (Vola ni Kawa Bula) to that of the Vuanirewa Registration in Lakeba, Lau under their mother, Adi Litiana Maopa, who was the sister of the Tui Nayau, Ratu Finau.

== Sources ==
- Who's Who in Fiji: Fiji's Golden Book of Record, by Berwick, Sam - 1990.
