= Fijian name =

Naming conventions in Fiji differ greatly, both between and within ethnic groups in Fiji. Indigenous Fijians have a set of cultural practices which today are more loosely followed, and to some extent blended with elements of European culture with regard to names. In the Indian community, traditional Indian naming practices co-exist with influence from the Fijian and European cultures.

== Indigenous Fijians ==
The use of surnames is not traditional in Fijian culture. In recent years, it has become more common, but remains far from universal. Whether to have a surname, and if so, whether to use it, are very much a matter of personal preference. One's last name is not always, therefore, a surname.

The majority of Fijians have two given names, a Christian name taken usually from the Bible, and a traditional name. A child may be baptized or registered with a surname, usually derived from the father's traditional given name. It is not unusual for persons baptized with surnames to discard them; some reclaim them later in life, and some who did not originally have one may later adopt their father's traditional name as a surname. It is not unheard of for Fijians to be known by different names at different stages of their lives.

=== Fijian naming examples ===
Prime Minister Sitiveni Rabuka was known as "Sitiveni Ligamamada" in his earlier days as a rugby player. Another notable example is George Speight, the instigator of a coup d'état in 2000, who contested the subsequent election under the name of "Ilikimi Naitini." He did not need to change his name by deed poll; he only had to register his candidacy with his surname and English given name omitted. Maciu Navakasuasua, a convicted accomplice of Speight's, revealed on October 28, 2005 that he had emigrated to Australia and avoided a blacklist against his name by using his grandfather's surname, which was registered on both his birth certificate and his passport.

Given the non-universal use of surnames, it is not uncommon for several members of a family all to bear different last names. Well known examples include Ratu Epeli Nailatikau (the President of Fiji between 2009 and 2015) and his brother, Tu'uakitau Cokanauto.

Many Fijians who do not have surnames register their children with their own traditional given name as a surname. Well known examples include the late Ratu Sir Kamisese Mara, Fiji's longtime Prime Minister and President, whose children are surnamed Mara, though it was his given name, not his surname as most foreigners wrongly suppose. President Nailatikau has likewise passed his given name on to his children as a surname.

Ratu Josefa Iloilovatu Uluivuda, better known simply as "Ratu Josefa Iloilo", who served as President of Fiji from 2000 to 2009, is an example of a Fijian who had a surname, but did not generally use it, except for legal purposes. Iloilo, the name by which he was generally known, which most non-Fijians mistakenly assumed to be his surname, was thus a diminutive of his second given name. This shortening of names is another common Fijian custom; another notable example of this phenomenon is rugby star Rupeni Caucaunibuca, widely referred to both inside and outside Fiji as Caucau.

The longest name of any Fijian is reported to be that of Levani Mavoa, a resident of Vadravadra on Gau Island. His full surname, Mavoaiuluivitimaitaveunienanodralakicakacakatakanavalenilotunagonenivadravadraenaesitetimaiuraqaicuruvularuaenavaleniveivakabulaimaiwaiyevoenayasanakocakaudrove, roughly translates to "injured while on Taveuni when the people of Vadravadra went to work at Ura Estate where he got injured and was later admitted for two months at the Waiyevo Hospital in the province of Cakaudrove" and is regarded as the longest Fijian word.

Fijians of chiefly rank use titles with their names. In most parts of Fiji, the title used by male chiefs is Ratu; the female equivalent is Adi. In Rewa Province, the local dialect substitutes Ro for both titles. In the Lau Islands, male and female chiefs are both styled Roko, while in Kadavu Island and western areas female chiefs are titled Bulou. The title is used immediately before the name, or before another title (e.g., Ratu Sir Kamisese Mara, Ratu Dr. Epeli Nailatikau). However, it follows military titles (e.g., Brigadier general Ratu Epeli Ganilau).

=== Names in tradition ===
Today, names may be inherited or passed on between relatives, but traditionally, Fijian names have a meaning and a history surrounding them. Before the arrival of Christianity and European culture, Fijian names were often based on circumstances or events surrounding the birth of the child, as well as other aspects. A modern example of a name that reflects both traditional and modern naming conventions is Joni Madraiwiwi, who served as Vice-President from 2004 to 2006. Joni is the Fijian rendering of "John". Madraiwiwi, which means "sour bread," was passed on from his grandfather, also Ratu Joni Madraiwiwi. The elder Madraiwiwi was named by his father, Mara Kapaiwai (a namesake, not an ancestor, of the modern Ratu Mara), who was facing execution and eating his last meal. Even the taste of bread had turned sour to him, hence the naming of his son.

Not all children were named for such dramatic events. Tanoa Senibua was named for the "fragrance of the Bua" flower which was in the air surrounding the child's birthplace, and "Tanoa" as the father of the child was drinking kava from a Tanoa when he received the news his son was born. A set protocol would be followed for the naming, but protocol is less strictly adhered to in this modern era.

== English names ==
Several Fijian names have been borrowed from English.

Fijian names with English translations
Fijian	English
Ana	Anna
Ela	Ella
Ema	Emma
Ilisapeci	Elizabeth
Jioji	George
Joana	Joan
Jone	John
Josefa	Joseph
Lia	Leah
Litia	Lydia
Mere	Mary
Mosese	Moses
Peni	Ben
Petero	Peter
Samuela	Samuel
Semi	Sam
Sera	Sarah
Sitiveni	Stephen
Tevita	David
Timoci	Timothy
Tomasi	Thomas
Viliame	William
Voreqe	Frank

== Indo-Fijians ==
- See main article: Indian name

The names of Fiji Islanders of Indian ancestry provide clues to an individual's religion and caste, and to what part of India their ancestors came from. Muslims very often have names taken from the Quran, while Sikhs are almost invariably surnamed Singh (if male) or Kaur (if female). Contrary to a common misconception, however, not everybody bearing that name is a Sikh: the great majority are Hindu (such as arguably the most notable Indo-Fijian, golfer Vijay Singh). Surnames, although not universal in India, have been adopted by almost all Indo-Fijians (despite their less-than-universal use by indigenous Fijians).

=== The caste system and names ===
Although the caste system is all but dead among Fiji Indians, Brahmins (priests) can be recognized by the surname, Sharma, while the Kshatriyas (warriors) can be recognized by the surname Singh.
