= Fiji Week, 2005 =

Fiji Week celebrations commenced on 7 October 2005, and culminated with Fiji Day on 10 October, the 35th anniversary of Fiji's independence from British colonial rule. The official program focused on national reconciliation and healing. It culminated with a day of prayer and fasting on Fiji Day. Schools, towns, and villages featured religious and cultural programs, with major celebrations Suva, Lautoka, and Labasa. The festivities were organized by the Ministry of National Reconciliation and Unity, with the assistance of the Ministry of Home Affairs and Immigration.

== Opening ceremonies, 7 October ==
Official ceremonies began with singing by a 500-member choir, accompanied by a military band. This was followed by an opening address by Vice-President Ratu Joni Madraiwiwi and speeches by Nadogo Paramount Chief Ratu Viliame Rovabokola, and Military Forces Chief of Staff Colonel Meli Saubulinayau. The launch was also attended by Finance Minister Ratu Jone Kubuabola in his capacity as Acting Prime Minister, standing in for Prime Minister Laisenia Qarase who was making an official visit to India and was therefore unable to attend the ceremony. I make them look gud

=== Vice-President Madraiwiwi ===
In his opening address, Vice-President Madraiwiwi called on the nation to face up to the question of its identity. This was necessary to foster true reconciliation and unity, he said. Issues like the flag and the national language needed to be considered, too, and should not be shied away from for fear of causing offence. "Should we retain our national flag that conveys historical continuity from the days of the Cakobau government to the period of British Colonial rule, or is it time for a new one?" he asked. "What language are we to adopt as the national language?" He was optimistic about the state of race relations in Fiji: "We celebrate who we are although we come from different communities. We are one nation, one people. We have differences and these cause problems and tension at times but we are not on the brink of inter ethnic strife," he considered.

Madraiwiwi cautioned that any political model adopted would have to be accepted by the population as a whole. "There is some suggestion that the Fijian model ought to be adopted as being the first people, the host culture, the landowners and the majority of the population. I have no issue with that proposition, so long as it is acceptable to all other communities as well," he said. "The critical element is inclusiveness. It is only when the model we adopt and implement is one all can accept, can the prospect of genuine and lasting reconciliation be real."

=== Ratu Viliame Rovabokola ===
In his address, Ratu Rovabokola said that Fiji was facing difficult times and that the only way forward was to pursue reconciliation and forgiveness and find any way possible to unite. Rovabokola, who holds the title of Tui Nadogo, or Paramount Chief of Nadogo in the Vanua Levu Province of Macuata, called on everyone affected by the events connected with the coup which rocked the nation in 2000, including the government, the Indo-Fijian community, the wives and children of the victims, and the people of Nadogo, to forgive and move on. "I know it's difficult to forget the past but I urge everyone here today (yesterday) to try and move the country forward," he said. "I believe if we all have faith in what we want to achieve, there's no doubt we will achieve it together as a community."

Rovabokola paid tribute to the Indo-Fijian community, and called on his people in Nadogo to treat them kindly in considering issues related to the leasing and use of land. "They have been part of our lives and they are the very ones who made us what we are today, and I urge you to consider their plight and assist them in whatever way possible," he said. Citizens of Indian origin should reciprocate by respecting indigenous Fijians' cultural differences, he considered.

=== Colonel Saubulininayau ===
Standing in for Armed Forces Commander Commodore Frank Bainimarama, Army Chief of Staff Colonel Meli Saubulininayau said that if the nation was to move forward, its citizens must be not only clever, but wise. Colonel Saubulininayau said that Fiji could not afford people who were bright, but unwise. He thought it imperative that the younger generation learn from the mistakes of the past, without dwelling on them.

== Fiji Day, 10 October ==
Fiji Day itself was marked by speeches from President Ratu Josefa Iloilovatu Uluivuda, Opposition Leader Mahendra Chaudhry, and National Federation Party leader Raman Pratap Singh.

=== President Iloilo ===
Speaking at Albert Park, President Iloilo said that all citizens needed to resolve to make a difference, as individuals, families, and communities, to the nation. He also called for an honest facing up to past injustices. "It is important that we continue to strengthen our economic and political progress. We can achieve this only if we can make an effort to face our past to allow relief and dignity for those who have experienced violations and to ensure that that pain is acknowledged," he said. He also emphasized that he considered spiritual faith and values essential to the nation's progress, and called on all citizens, schools, cultural and religious institutions to promote what he called Fiji's national values.

=== Mahendra Chaudhry ===
Opposition Leader Mahendra Chaudhry said Fiji should take the time tor reflect on where the nation was heading. He lamented that since the coups of 1987, the country had made little progress, a once prosperous and united nation had slipped back into poverty and division, with a deterioration in the basic services of health and education. These problems needed to be addressed urgently, he said. He also claimed that the government was using the nation's independence day to promote its political agenda. The theme of "Promoting national unity and healing through forgiveness" linked the celebrations too closely with the controversial Reconciliation, Tolerance, and Unity Bill. The bill, which Chaudhry strongly opposes, is aimed at empowering a commission to compensate victims and pardon perpetrators of the 2000 coup, and is alleged by Chaudhry and other detractors to be nothing other than a legal mechanism for releasing supporters of the present government who have been convicted and imprisoned for their role in it.

=== Raman Pratap Singh ===
In his address, the leader of the National Federation Party said that the country really needed leaders who would sacrifice their personal interests and work together for the sake of the nation. Infighting, communal rivalry, cheap politicking, and blind greed had shattered the image that the world had once had of Fiji, widely described as "the way the world should be." "Instead of sharing and co-existing, the people have retreated into their racial compartments instead of uniting both as communities and as a nation," he said. "Instead of uniting as a nation, our leaders have created a racial gulf that is tearing our island nation apart." While acknowledging that leaders occasionally called for harmony, he insisted that it would not be achievable without working to establish common ground.

== Controversies ==
Fiji Labour Party parliamentarian Lekh Ram Vayeshnoi said that people had been seen attending other functions in the capital, and blamed Prime Minister Qarase's absence for what he said was a poor turnout to the launch of the celebrations. The timing of the Prime Minister's official visit to India, coinciding with the celebrations of the 35th anniversary of the country's independence, was unpatriotic, he said. "The Prime Minister’s visit to India on the 35th anniversary of Fiji’s independence reflects his lack of patriotism. There was no compelling need for Mr Qarase and his excessively large batch of hangers on to depart now, under the pretext of opening the consulate, when it has been in operation for almost a year," Vayeshnoi declared. The visit to India was nothing more than a publicity stunt, he alleged, saying that it would not work as the Indian government was well-informed about Qarase's "racist" policies.

This was not the first time Fiji's national celebrations have attracted controversy. Fiji Week, 2004, the previous year, was marred by a boycott from several leading politicians and other public figures, who accused the government of using the ceremonies to promote a political agenda.

== Features ==
The Civil Service of Fiji features prominently in the celebrations. All government departments and ministries are being made open to create public awareness of their services. Events include a "Walk for Health" program, featuring aerobics and a walk through Albert Park, organized by the Ministry of Health. Other events include Disaster Awareness Week, Family Day and Citywide Youth Network, featuring numerous children's games and activities, along with multicultural programs and handicraft shows. The Ministry for Women and Social Welfare is organizing programs for orphanages and retirement homes.
