= Isireli =

Isireli is a Fijian masculine given name. Notable people with the name include:

- Isireli Leweniqila, Fijian politician
- Isireli Naikelekelevesi (born 1976), Fijian middle-distance runner
- Isireli Tuvuki, Fijian politician

== See also ==
- Sireli
