= Sireli =

Sireli is a Fijian masculine given name. Notable people with the name include:

- Sireli Bobo (born 1976), Fijian rugby player
- Sireli Ledua (born 1985), Fijian rugby player
- Sireli Maqala (born 2000), Fijian rugby player
- Sireli Naqelevuki (born 1980), Fijian rugby player

== See also ==
- Isireli
