= J.A.R. Dovi =

Fijian doctor and administrator (1906–1971)

Ratu Jione Atonio Rabici "Tom" Doviverata OBE (1906 – November 1971) was a Bau chief and medical doctor and administrator in colonial Fiji.

== Heritage and family ==
Ratu Dovi, as he is better known, was a scion of the Tui Kaba, the powerful ruling clan of the Vanua of Bau in Fiji's Tailevu province. He was the youngest child of Ratu Joni Madraiwiwi, an early colonial administrator who served as Roko Tui Ra and later as Roko Tui Tailevu.

Dovi's mother, Adi Litiana Maopa hailed from the chiefly Vuanirewa clan of Lakeba; she was the eldest child of Roko Tevita Vakacere Uluilakeba Tui Nayau, suzerain of the Lau province. Her mother, also of the Tui Kaba was Adi Asenaca Kakua the eldest daughter of Ratu Seru Cakobau the Vunivalu of Bau who ceded the islands to the United Kingdom in 1874.

Dovi's eldest brother Ratu Sir Lala Sukuna was an elder statesman and held the paramount title of Tui Lau. Ratu Sukuna was the first Fijian to obtain a university qualification. He read law at Oxford, attained an LLB and was admitted as a Barrister (Middle Temple) in the High Court of England. He served in the Legislative Council as a member and later as Speaker. He is best remembered for his work as Secretary for Native Affairs (Talai-ni-Kovana) and Chairmanship of the Native Lands Commission; his accomplishments include the passing of the Native Lands Ordinance and establishment of the Native Land Trust Board.

His eldest sister Adi Kacaraini Loaloakubou, was the mother of former Lord Mayor of Suva Ratu Meli Vakarewakobau.

His next eldest sister Adi Asenaca Teimumu Kuini Vuikaba was the first Fijian to graduate as a fully qualified nurse. She married the Tui Noikoro a high chief of the Navosa district of Nadroga province. Her granddaughter and namesake Adi Kuini Vuikaba Speed was briefly Deputy Prime Minister in the People's Coalition Government of Mahendra Chaudry.

His other older siblings were Ratu Tiale Wimbledon Thomas Vuiyasawa and Adi Salote Mokoiwaqa.

After Dovi was conceived, the Roko Tui Bau at the time, approached his parents with an unusual request. He presented a tabua or sperm whale's tooth as was customary with traditional ceremonies of Fiji and asked that the unborn child become heir to his title upon his death. Presumably Dovi's older siblings would be in the line of succession for the superior title of Vunivalu of Bau. The old chief's request was granted and so when he completed his education and returned to Fiji, he was installed by the Vusaratu chiefs (Roko Tui Viwa, Roko Tui Kiuva, Roko Tui Cautata) in a ceremony witnessed by Ratu Popi Seniloli (at the time Vunivalu of Bau), Roko Tui Namata, Roko Tui Veikau in a simple yaqona ceremony in the Vatanitawake.

Dovi, as most chiefs, had a dynastic marriage partner chosen for him by his elders. He spurned that choice and married Adi Losalini Raravuya Uluiviti, a lady of rank from Nairai, in Fiji's Lomaiviti province. She was one of the first women to become a member of Fiji's Legislative Council and subsequently a Member of Parliament.

They had four children: Ratu Joni Maenabua Tuimacilai Madraiwiwi, Ratu Timoci Taniela Taliai Tavanavanua, Adi Litiana Maopa, Adi Viviana Valotu Sofi Veisaca.

Dovi's eldest child, however, was a daughter, Adi Monika Tuikilakila whose mother was a lady of rank from the island of Kadavu.

His eldest son succeeded him as Roko Tui Bau (title) and is a former Vice-President of Fiji, prominent lawyer and former High Court Judge.

== Education and career ==
Like all his older siblings, he was educated by an English tutor engaged by his father at home. At the time this was the residence of the provincial administrator or Roko Tui in the province of Ra. When the tutor indicated he was ready, he was sent off to boarding school at the Wanganui Boys' College in New Zealand.

After attaining university entrance, he attended Otago University and studied medicine. After completing matriculation, he became the first fully qualified Fijian medical doctor, much as his brother was first university graduate/lawyer and his sister was the first nurse. Their father was the first Fijian provincial administrator or Roko Tui and had to struggle to educate himself and had always stressed to his children the importance and value of a western education.

He died in November 1971.

| Preceded by ?? | Roko Tui Bau; 1938–1969 | Succeeded by Ratu Joni Madraiwiwi |
