= Tevita =

Tevita is the Fijian and Tongan form of the name David. It may refer to:

- Tevita Aholelei, IFBB professional bodybuilder
- Tevita Folau (born 1985), professional Australian rugby league player
- Tevita Leo-Latu (born 1981), professional rugby league footballer
- Tevita Li (born 1995), New Zealand professional rugby union player
- Tevita Makasini (born 1976 or 1977), Tongan football assistant referee
- Tevita Mailau (born 1985), rugby union player who represents Auckland in the Air New Zealand Cup
- Tevita Mara, Fijian career soldier, with the rank of lieutenant colonel as of early 2006
- Tevita Metuisela (born 1983), Australian professional rugby league player
- Tevita Momoedonu, Fijian chief and has served as the fifth Prime Minister of Fiji twice
- Tevita Ofahengaue (born 1975), the 246th and last pick in the 2001 NFL Draft
- Tevita Taumoepeau (born 1974), Tongan international rugby union player
- Tevita Tuʻifua (born 1975), Tongan rugby union prop
- Tevita Uluilakeba III (1898–1966), the 12th Tui Nayau and Sau Ni Vanua of the Lau Islands
- Tevita Vaʻenuku (born 1967), Tongan international rugby union player
- Tevita Vaikona (born 1974), professional rugby footballer
- Tevita Vakalalabure (1927–2005), Fijian chief and politician
- Tevita Vuibau (born 1956), Fijian marine geology specialist and former principal scientific officer in the Mineral Resource Department
