= Maca Likutabua =

Lady Liku (1934 – 24 March 2000) was a woman of chiefly title in the Fiji Islands and was the wife of the late Ratu Sir Lala Sukuna.

Maca Likutabua Gucake was born in the village of Tubou, on the island of Lakeba, in the Lau Islands to a chiefly family. Her father, Roko Lenaitasi Gucake was from the Yavusa Vuanirewa, the ruling tribe of the Lau islands, and belonged to the Noble Vatuwaqa household. Her mother, Mereani Naisua was the daughter of Ratu Jone Tawake of the chiefly Tui Kaba household of Bau.

== Marriage ==
Lady Liku was known for her beauty and was considered to be the most beautiful young lady in Lau. Her beauty did not go unnoticed, in fact it caught the eye of Ratu Sir Lala Sukuna who was then the Tui Lau. Ratu Sukuna, using his status as Tui Lau, easily arranged his marriage to Lady Liku.

She travelled from Lakeba to Viti Levu for the arranged marriage, and as she got off the boat, it was said that the people saw her and shook their heads in disappointment because they felt her beauty had gone to waste.

They finally married in September 1957 when she was 21 years old, and at the time, Ratu Sukuna was 69 years old. The marriage did not even last a year as Ratu Sukuna died at sea en route to England on the ship Arcadia.

== Death ==
Lady Liku lived on as a widow and never married again, nor did she have any children. She died on March 24, 2000, from Diabetes in the Colonial War Memorial Hospital in Suva.
