= Mary Ann Lyth =

19th century British missionary and translator

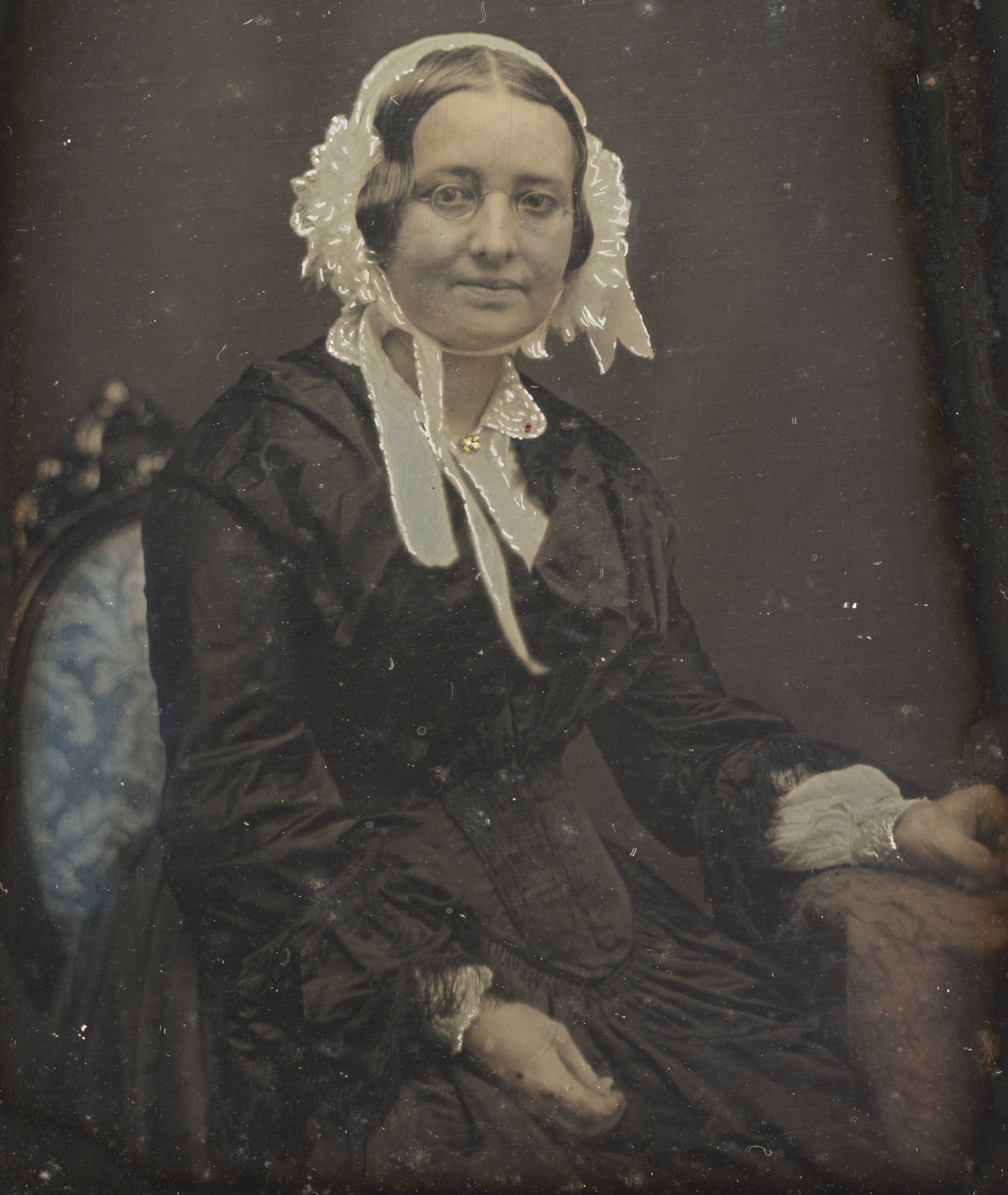
- Fijian missionary Mary Ann Lyth, ca 1860
- Born: Mary Ann Hardy; 1811; England
- Died: September 1890 (aged 78–79); York, England
- Occupations: missionary; translator; teacher
- Spouse: Richard Burdsall Lyth (m. 1836; died 1877)
- Children: 9
- Writing career
- Language: English

Mary Ann Lyth (née , Hardy; after marriage, Mrs. R. B. Lyth; 1811 – September 1890) was a British missionary, translator, and teacher. She traveled to several countries with her husband, Rev. R. B. Lyth, M.D., the first Medical Missionary sent out by the Wesleyan Methodist Missionary Society, London. She provided basic European-style education at her various stations, and helped her husband as a nurse. She also assisted in the translation of the Bible, and other literary work.

== Early life ==
Mary Ann Hardy was born in England, 1811. Her father was John Hardy, of Preston, Lancashire; her mother was the daughter of Robert Spence of York. Her siblings were Rev. Robert Spence Hardy (1803–1868), missionary to India, and Ceylon; and John Spence Hardy (died 1892), architect.

== Career ==
=== Tonga ===
In 1836, she married Rev. Richard Burdsall Lyth, M.D. (1810–1887), at Apperley Bridge, Yorkshire. In September of that year, he was ordained as a minister of the Wesleyan Methodist Church, and in the following month, they left for Tonga in the South Seas, stopping first at Hobart, Tasmania, and Sydney, Australia.

In Tonga, Mrs. Lyth acquired a knowledge of the Tongan language, which proved of great service to her in other parts of Polynesia. At that time, Christianity had swept over Tonga, and thousands were converted to it. One of the first expressions of that new life was in missionary fervor and a desire to send the Gospel to the Fijians.

=== Fiji ===
The Fijian Mission commenced as an extension of the Friendly Islands Mission. Dr. and Mrs. Lyth were sent to Somosomo, in 1838. It was the most difficult station in Fiji at the time. Here, Mrs. Lyth acquired an accurate knowledge of the Fijian language. Dr. Lyth's mission was to care for the bodies of the Fijians, and thus seek to win their souls for Christ. The sick were brought to him from every quarter. In the house given by the chief as a temporary hospital, patients requiring nursing and careful dieting were under the care of Mrs. Lyth. She relieved suffering and prolonged and saved life by her care for the sick. She also preached the gospel to the cannibals. She also taught the natives how to nurse the sick and trained them for similar service. Many profited by her lessons and became skillful nurses. All the while, tribal wars were raging around, the quiet of the hospital was broken by the cannibal death-drum, and bodies were dragged in front of the mission house to be offered in sacrifice before they were put into the ovens. Yet Mrs. Lyth never complained about the hardship. Commodore Charles Wilkes, of the United States Exploring Expedition, visited Somosomo, and he wrote of Mrs. Lyth and Mrs. Hunt:—

"There are few situations in which so much physical and moral courage is required as those in which these devoted and pious women are placed, and nothing but a deep sense of duty and a strong determination to perform it could induce civilized persons to subject themselves to the sight of such horrid scenes as they are called upon almost daily to witness. I know no situation so trying for ladies to live in, particularly when pleasing and well informed, as we found at Somosomo."

After five years spent at Somosomo, Dr. Lyth was removed to Lakemba, where the people had become Christians and the great demand was for native teachers. The whole circuit was turned into a training institution. Two days each week, the local preachers and class leaders came to the mission station for instruction. After a lesson in theology, the outline of a sermon was written on the blackboard and explained; then it was copied, to be preached in all the villages on the following Sunday by men who had facility to do so. But while the men were thus getting help for their work, Mrs. Lyth had their wives in another room teaching them to sew and to knit, and giving a Bible reading, which the women would repeat when they returned to the village. She was able to do more for the wives of teachers because the nurses trained by herself could do the work of the hospital under her general supervision.

Eight years were spent in Lakemba, and then Dr. and Mrs. Lyth were appointed to Viwa. Here was the printing press, and Mrs. Lyth was soon assisting in the translation of the Bible. She was valuable assistant in all literary work, for her knowledge of the language was accurate and she was a ready writer. It was during her residence at Viwa that what she calls in her journal a "heavier cross than usual" had to be taken up. When fourteen women, captured as prisoners of war, were about to be killed and offered in sacrifice, and then cooked and eaten at a festival in honor of important visitors at Bau, Mrs. Lyth and Mrs. Calvert, when their husbands were away on a distant island, went to try to rescue the victims. The death-drum, the firing of muskets, and the piercing shrieks told that the butchery was begun when they reached the shore, but they hastened through the crowds of cannibals to the house of the old king, Tanoa —admittance to which was forbidden to all women excepting those of the household— and with a whale's tooth in each hand as an offering, thrust themselves into his presence with their plea for mercy. Their audacity startled the old king, whose hearing was dull, and in their earnestness they raised their voices to plead for the lives of the cannibal women. The old king was overcome, and said, "Those who are dead are dead, but those who are alive shall live." Five of these women were saved, and thanked them for saving their lives. A navy officer, after a visit to them, wrote:—

"If anything could have increased our admiration of their heroism, it was the unaffected manner in which, when pressed by us to relate the circumstances of their awful visit, they spoke of it as the simple performance of an ordinary duty."

=== Later appointments ===
They returned to England for four years to manage the publication of the Scriptures in Finjian language, before returning to Fiji with the Fijian Bibles. In 1855, they removed to Auckland where Dr. Lyth was appointed as Governor/Chaplain to Wesley College, the college for missionaries' children. In 1858, they returned to England, having been gone for 22 years. Afterwards, Dr. and Mrs. Lyth were appointed to Gibraltar for five years. This was followed by two years of chaplaincy at Shorncliffe Camp.

== Personal life ==
The Lyths had nine children, some of whom died in childhood (one died in Somosomo).

The couple retired in 1876 to Fulford, York and Dr. Lyth died the following year. Mrs. Lyth died in September 1890, in York, aged 80, and was buried on 18 September.

Some of her letters are held at the Fiji Museum Library in Suva. Some family photos are held at the State Library, New South Wales.
