= 2027 in Fiji =

- Decades: 2000s; 2010s; 2020s
- See also: Other events of 2027; Timeline of Fijian history

Events of 2027 in Fiji.

== Events ==
- By 6 February – Next Fijian general election

== Holidays ==
- 1 January – New Year's Day
- 26 March – Good Friday
- 27 March – Easter Saturday
- 29 March – Easter Monday
- 15 August – The Prophet's Birthday
- 7 September – Constitution Day
- 10 October – Fiji Day
- 29 October – Diwali
- 25 December – Christmas Day
- 26 December – Boxing Day

== See also ==
- 2026–27 South Pacific cyclone season
- 2027 Pacific typhoon season
