= Nasaqalau =

Village on the Fijian island of Lakeba

Coordinates: 18.1780°S 178.8100°W

Nasaqalau is one of the eight villages on the island of Lakeba, in Fiji's Lau archipelago. The Yavusa Naseuvou includes four mataqalis (or sub-clans), namely Dreketi, Loma, Nakabuta and Nautoqumu. Nasaqalau was also home to the first settlers on the chiefly island who were led by the Tui Lakeba as he continued his search for new land from Wainikeli in Taveuni.

== Shark calling for yearly feast (Saukakana) ==
One clan in Nasaqalau, whose ancestors came from Wainikeli on the island of Taveuni, is famous for its ability to call sharks from the sea. An annual ceremony, led by a bete (Fijian traditional priest) is performed every October or November. For several days, offerings of kava are made. On the actual day, a caller wades neck-high in the water and chants. Within 30 minutes, a white shark would appear, leading a school of about fifty other sharks. It would encircle the caller who then leads them out to shallow waters to be slaughtered with nothing else but coconut branches. The white shark is not slaughtered and is allowed to go free.

== The last call ==
The last successful shark calling ritual was performed in 1948 by Adi Mere Latu Tuilakeba of the Dreketi clan. This was witnessed by many of the villagers, including her niece Luisa Lavenia Segawekana, also known as Luisa Tupua (14 May 1938 – 17 June 2010), who recalled her instruction that the shark calling ritual must not be practised again because it had become obsolete, with some reverting to paganism through the worship of the Shark God. In 1992, there was another attempt to revive the ritual by her nephew, Isireli Jikoitoga Veitokiyaki for a BBC documentary. This was not successful as per earlier instructions by the village elders to cease the practice.

== The caves ==
Nasaqalau is also known for several caves in the vicinity of the village. Oso Nabukete, also known as the Pregnant Women's Cave, is the most famous of these. According to legend, a woman attempting to hide her pregnancy will not be able to pass through the mouth of the cave. It is adjoined by Qara Bulu which was once used as a dungeon for prisoners in times of tribal war. A third cave, Koro ni Vono, was used as a place of confinement for tuberculosis patients who remained there till their demise, in a desperate bid to minimise the rapid, widespread infection to the rest of the community.

== Address protocol and title ==
The chiefly title is Turaga na Ramasi. The proper chiefly titular address (Ai Cavuti) is Naseuvou vua na Ramasi.

== Traditional political takeover ==
The rich traditional and cultural heritage and the often suppressed and untold history of the people of Nasaqalau have been watered-down through the contrived arrogation of the traditional authority of the Tui Nasaqalau - a socio-political transition which was orchestrated by the then Tui Nayau, Ratu Tevita Uluilakeba III with the aid of the colonial government. According to Raymond Young's (2001) "A Land with a Tangled Soul: Lakeban Traditions and the Native Land Commission", NLC records featured an elder of Waciwaci village in Lakeba providing his contributions to the Veitarogi ni Vanua as follows (quote), "..The Vuanirewa chart [official NLC genealogy] starts off with the third generation.... Ratu Sukuna and Kaminieli [Tubanavau] removed the first and second generations because if they kept those two generations, the Vuanirewa would be two steps down, after Nasaqalau and Waciwaci... so they purposefully removed the connection between Waciwaci and Nasaqalau from the top, which leaves the Vuanirewa chart starting off with the third generation, Niumataiwalu, the second grandson of Tui Vanuakula." (unquote) The Yavusa Naseuvou is descended from the senior lineage of Tui Vanuakula and shares this common ancestry with the Yavusa Vuanirewa of Tubou, Lakeba.

The weakening of the Tui Nasaqalau thence empowered the Tui Nayau to possess and share parts of the land and fisheries boundaries (qoliqoli) which traditionally belong to the Yavusa Naseuvou. There are ongoing consultations and constructive dialogue among the Yavusa Naseuvou, the Yavusa Vuanirewa and the iTaukei Land Commission to re-establish Nasaqalau's traditional land and fisheries boundaries to this end.

On the 24th of December 2019, the Yavusa Naseuvou installed Tomasi Tikoimaleya to the position of Tui Nasaqalau. He is a direct descendant of Tui Vanuakula, of the traditional kingdom of Verata. After more than 160 years, another of Tui Vanuakula's descendants has been inaugurated to the chiefly position.
