= Joni Madraiwiwi =

Fijian lawyer (1957-2016)

The Honourable Ratu Joni Madraiwiwi

Chief Justice of the Supreme Court of Nauru
- In office 8 September 2014 – 29 September 2016 (died in service)
- Preceded by: Geoffrey Eames
- Succeeded by: Filimone Jitoko

Vice-President of the Republic of Fiji
- In office 14 December 2004 – 15 January 2007
- President: Ratu Josefa Iloilo
- Preceded by: Jope Seniloli
- Succeeded by: Epeli Nailatikau (2009)

Judge of the High Court of Fiji of the Republic of Fiji
- In office 2 February 1997 – 22 June 2000

Permanent Arbitrator, Office of the Attorney-General of Fiji
- In office 5 April 1991 – 31 January 1997

Solicitor, Office of the Attorney-General of Fiji
- In office 1983–1991

Personal details
- Born: 10 November 1957
- Died: 29 September 2016 (aged 58) Suva, Fiji
- Spouse: Adi Lusi Tuivanuavou
- Education: University of Adelaide; McGill University
- Profession: Lawyer

Ratu Joni Madraiwiwi, Lord Madraiwiwi Tangatatonga (10 November 1957 – 29 September 2016) was a prominent Fijian lawyer, legal scholar, jurist, and politician. He served as vice-president, and also acting president, of Fiji, and Chief Justice of Nauru.

Ratu Madraiwiwi was ceremonially sworn in as vice-president on 10 January 2005, following his nomination by President Ratu Josefa Iloilo, and his subsequent approval by the Great Council of Chiefs on 14 December 2004. He served as vice-president beginning 14 December 2004 to complete the unexpired term of his predecessor, Ratu Jope Seniloli, who had resigned in disgrace on 29 November 2004 in the wake of his convictions for treason concerning his role in the Fiji coup of 2000. Madraiwiwi's first priority was to restore dignity and respect to the vice-presidency. However, on 5 December 2006, Madraiwiwi was informed of pending abolition of the vice-presidency, to take effect officially on 15 January 2007, by the Military Commander, Commodore Frank Bainimarama, who had seized power in a military coup. He was forcibly evicted from his official residence and his office on the night of 6 December. Yet, Madraiwiwi announced in the second week of January 2007 that he was merely "on leave" as Vice-President of Fiji and intended in the meantime to resume private practice as an attorney at Howards law firm.

In 2010, Madraiwiwi was presented with a Tongan life peerage and the title of Lord Madraiwiwi Tangatatonga by King George Tupou V of Tonga. Owing to his Fijian and Nauruan nationalities, he was nominated as early as 2013, and subsequently appointed in 2014, to the Supreme Court of the Republic of Nauru as its Chief Justice, the highest position in that country's judicial system, which he held until his death on 29 September 2016.

A lifelong legal scholar, Madraiwiwi was a prolific writer and public speaker who authored several articles and books, including A Personal Perspective, his last book.

== Career ==
Descended from a long line of Fijian royal hereditary rulers, Ratu Madraiwiwi was the eldest son of Bau chief Ratu Jione Atonio Rabici Doviverata and Fijian Member of Parliament Adi Losalini Raravuya Uluiviti, and was the namesake of his paternal grandfather, Joni Madraiwiwi I, a Fijian Ratu and early colonial administrator in what was then the British Crown Colony of Fiji. He was born in Levuka, on the island of Ovalau, and subsequently titled Turaga na Roko Tui Bau, a vassal chief to the Vunivalu of Bau, Paramount Chief of the Kubuna Confederacy. He obtained a Law degree from the University of Adelaide in Australia, and then left for Montreal, Canada for graduate study in Law at McGill University. For his Master of Laws (LL.M.) degree which he obtained in 1989 at the McGill University Faculty of Law, he chose to specialize in comparative law. His LL.M. thesis on air and space law was titled The archipelagic regime under the United Nations convention of the Law of the Sea 1982 : its development and effect on air law He also pursued and obtained a Diploma in Air and Space Law (DipA&SL) from the Institute of Air and Space Law at McGill University a year earlier in 1988.

From McGill, Madraiwiwi came back to Fiji and worked for the Office of the Attorney-General of Fiji as solicitor, serving from 1983 to 1991. He was then appointed a permanent arbitrator in that office until 1997, when he became a judge of the High Court, which stands at the apex of the Fijian judiciary. He resigned from the bench in mid-2000 in protest against the coup d'état that saw the elected government toppled, the constitution abrogated, and the judiciary reorganised by decree. Thereafter, he practised law privately as a partner of Howards. In addition, he served as director of Fiji Times Limited (the nation's leading newspaper) and trustee of the Fijian Trust Fund. He was also a human rights commissioner and former chairman of the Citizens Constitutional Forum, a pro-democracy and human rights organisation.

In 2004, he was installed as Vice-President of Fiji. Rewa high chief Ro Jone Mataitini said the chiefs unanimously supported Ratu Madraiwiwi Vice-Presidential appointment because of his extensive knowledge of the law and because of his great rapport with other racial and religious groups. In this regard, he was regarded as a compromise between those who insisted on reserving the Vice-Presidency for a high chief, and those (including Ratu Epeli Ganilau, the former Chairman of the Great Council of Chiefs), who believed it was time for a non-Fijian, to be appointed to the post as a gesture of goodwill to the Indo-Fijian and other minorities. Fiji Labour Party leader and former prime minister Mahendra Chaudhry also welcomed Ratu Madraiwiwi's appointment. "Ratu Joni is an eminent scholar who served Fiji with distinction in the last 20 years holding high offices. He is fully conversant with the affairs of the State and he will certainly restore dignity and decorum to the high office," Chaudhry said. Tribal and regional factors played a part in the appointment. Fiji's tribes each belong to one of three confederacies – Kubuna, Burebasaga, and Tovata. One member of the Great Council of Chiefs explained to the media that they had understood that as President Iloilo is from Burebasaga and his predecessor, Ratu Sir Kamisese Mara was from Tovata, the current vice-president should be from Kubuna. Installed as the Roko Tui Bau on 11 November 1995, Ratu Madraiwiwi is one of the highest chiefs of the Kubuna Confederacy.

The Constitution of Fiji assigns a purely ceremonial role to the vice-president, apart from the power to exercise the functions of the Presidency should the President be unable to perform his duties. With the 84-year-old President Iloilo suffering from ill health, the appointment to the Vice-Presidency of a respected individual who could assume the Presidency in the event of an emergency was regarded as a priority. Madraiwiwi, in fact, was acting President of Fiji in the absence of Iloilo in 2005 and 2006.

== Career after the Vice-Presidency ==
In 2008, when a Truth and Reconciliation Commission was established in the Solomon Islands, in the aftermath of ethnic conflict, it was to have five commissioners, including two foreign nationals. Madraiwiwi was asked, and accepted, to serve as one of the two foreign commissioners. The Commission noted that he brought "strong international human rights experience to the TRC".

In January 2010, King George Tupou V elevated him to the Life Peerage in the Kingdom of Tonga, with the title of Lord Madraiwiwi Tangatatonga. Ratu Joni became the Chief Justice of Nauru following the resignation of former Chief Justice, Geoffrey Eames QC. He died in service as Supreme Court Chief Justice of Nauru.

== Opinions ==
Madraiwiwi is noted for his outspoken calls for political and cultural moderation, and for his efforts to encourage people to come up with creative and practical solutions to issues that have caused tension in Fijian society.

=== Ethnic tensions and human rights ===
Madraiwiwi says that ethnic Fijians really have nothing to fear from the large Indo-Fijian population, as native ownership of most of the land is enshrined in the Constitution. Madraiwiwi has called for a national discussion on adopting an inclusive label for all Fijian citizens. He pointed out that the Fijian label is very often taken to mean the Fijian ethnic group, rather than the citizenry as a whole. "While I personally have no problem with the term Fijian, I recognise many others in my community are not," he said in a speech to the Lautoka Rotary Club on 14 March 2005. "But let us not leave it there. Let us find other options," he proposed.

Addressing the Fiji Law Society convention at Warwick Hotel on Fiji's Coral Coast on 2 July 2005, Madraiwiwi said that the feeling of insecurity felt by many indigenous Fijians would disappear when more of them became better educated. He said that most members of his ethnic community did not trust the Constitution or the rule of law sufficiently, as both instruments could be impugned by whatever government was in power – an attitude that needed to be changed. His people needed to understand, he said, that the rule of law was not an alien Western concept, but one that was, in fact, rooted as much in Fijian as in Western traditions.

At an education workshop in Suva on 13 July, Madraiwiwi said it was a mistake to view indigenous rights as superior to human rights in general. He said that the ILO Convention 169 (the Convention concerning Indigenous and Tribal Peoples in Independent Countries) clearly stated that indigenous rights were not separate from human rights and could not be asserted at their expense. Articles referring to a self-contained system of governance for indigenous peoples were, he said, for traditional and cultural matters, and did "not legitimise or authorise indigenous supremacy."

Madraiwiwi also rejected arguments by some politicians that when the United Kingdom granted independence to Fiji in 1970, they should have handed power back to the chiefs, calling this position legally untenable. "To say that power should have been returned to the Fijian chiefs is to ignore what occurred between 1874 and 1970," Madraiwiwi said. He said there was a legal continuity from the chiefs, through British colonial rule, to the modern Fijian state. Universal rules, he said, required Fijians to temper their indigenous rights with the fundamental human rights enjoyed by other communities, though he admitted that many found that difficult to accept. "It is an unpalatable truth for Fijians because it flies in the face of everything they have been brought up to believe and conditioned to accept," he said. Madraiwiwi said tensions often arose because fundamental rights were collective, while indigenous rights were individual in character.

He reiterated this position in his closing address to the Roundtable on Human Rights, Indigenous Rights, and Nationalism, organised by the Fiji Human Rights Commission at Suva's Holiday Inn on 23 July. He insisted that indigenous rights and fundamental rights are mutually dependent and neither can exist without the other.

In a message to cadets at Xavier College in Ba on 27 July, Madraiwiwi said that the cycle of blame trapped Fiji islanders into racially polarised politics. He said that Fiji was the richer for its ethnic and cultural diversity, and commended the cadet corps for having overcome ethnic divisions to operate as a cohesive whole.

=== Relationship between church and state ===
In the same Lautoka speech, Madraiwiwi opposed calls for the establishment of a Christian state in Fiji, saying that it would hinder a "correct relationship" between the overwhelmingly Christian ethnic Fijians and the mainly Hindu and Muslim Indo-Fijian community. He expressed concern that the growth of newer fundamentalist denominations at the expense of the long-dominant Methodist Church "evoked a less tolerant dimension to the work of some Christian churches." Madraiwiwi has since reiterated that proposals to establish a Christian state ignore the potential for division and conflict. Speaking at the Religion and Governance Forum in Suva on 17 May 2005, he said the proposal had its roots in the initial conversion of chiefs to Christianity and in the Deed of Cession, in which the chiefs ceded sovereignty to the United Kingdom in 1874, but considered that in a multi-faith country like Fiji, it would not be wise to establish any one faith. In an earlier address to a Hindu gathering on 28 March, Madraiwiwi had criticised government politicians for couching pronouncements in purely Christian terms. "When national leaders address the people of Fiji in specifically Christian terms, whatever the occasion, nearly half of our people are excluded," he said. "When prayer in mixed company is uttered in terms of a purely Christian God, we unintentionally omit and diminish others present of different faiths. When we use Christian symbolism to promote reconciliation, forgiveness and unity, we discount the contribution and equally rich traditions extant in other faiths and cultural traditions."

Madraiwiwi has also said that churches have failed to do enough to confront serious social problems, including rape, incest, and other violent crimes, and has called on Christian leaders to set an example for the people to follow by practising what they preach. Speaking in the Lau Islands on 12 May 2005, he pointed to the late Lauan chief and former Fijian President, Ratu Sir Kamisese Mara, as a one "who not only went to church but lived the life of a Christian," and called on religious leaders to do likewise. Later, speaking at the Religion and Governance Forum in Suva on 18 May, he said that there have been cases of churches making unreasonable demands on parishioners in terms of time and natural resources, which have led to "a significant erosion on family values". He also called on churches to address the problem of excessive yaqona drinking, which he said was a major social problem. He expressed concern that the Methodist Church, to which approximately two-thirds of indigenous Fijians belong, had not addressed these issues at their recent conference, but conceded that as Fijian cultural conditioning aims for consensus rather than frank debates, raising such matters could cause divisions.

On 13 May 2005, Roman Catholic Archbishop Petero Mataca said he agreed that churches had a role to play in reducing crime, but said that they should not be seen as solely to blame for the problem.

=== Views on Fiji's chiefly system ===
Madraiwiwi has also spoken of the need for chiefs to be accessible to their people and to listen to them. "It will be impossible to achieve this if the elders and chiefs have their own way and are too proud of their chiefly status to not bring themselves down to the people," Madraiwiwi told the Lau Provincial Council on 11 May 2005.

In an address to the Pacific Regional Workshop on Leadership Development in Lami on 9 July, Madraiwiwi said that the chiefly system in Fiji and other Pacific Island nations would have to adapt to modern realities. Traditional leadership remained significant, he said, but its role was diminishing. He said that British colonisation had reinforced the chiefly system and in fact fossilised it. Historically, there had been some flexibility, as chiefs had to earn their positions through military prowess, but British protection had given the chiefs an unprecedented "reach and depth", he said. Christianity, too, had buttressed the system. The church and the chiefly system had become intertwined and mutually reinforced each other, not always to society's benefit. The changing realities of the modern world, however, meant that traditional leaders would have to share the leadership of the country with others. He also said that chiefs and church leaders would have to recognise that tradition did not always sit easily with human rights, and that sensitivity was needed to defuse the inevitable tension between the church and tradition on one hand and human rights on the other.

At the Fiji Medical Association conference on 1 September, Madraiwiwi said that the days when chiefs, religious ministers, and state officials expected to be treated with deference were gone, and he welcomed the change. He also called on doctors to adopt a higher public profile, as by virtue of their training, skills, and income level, they held a position that required them to provide leadership to the community. "The world outside medicine is yours as well," he said. "Remedying ailments and illness is not the sum total of your existence. You are also citizens of this country and need to be seen in that role."

Madraiwiwi has also maintained that democracy has not yet completely settled down in Fiji. Opening the conference of the Commonwealth Parliamentary Association in Nadi on 6 September 2005, he said that Fiji had yet to fully recognise and appreciate the concepts of human rights and the rule of law. Despite constitutional guarantees, certain aspects of democracy were somewhat tenuous, he considered. Ethnic tensions exacerbated the problem, he said. Indigenous Fijians and Indo-Fijians had competing priorities that would need to be addressed in a manner fair to all, he said. "All our communities have to make the effort to reach out to each other rather than waiting passively for gestures that may never be made," Madraiwiwi declared. He added a note of caution, however: "Social integration cannot be forced and not proceed at the pace that the community considers uncomfortable." He was optimistic about the overall state of race relations, but thought that more needed to be done: "Relationships between our ethnic communities are generally good but we need to continue weaving connections to the point where they are interwoven and unbreakable," he said.

In the same speech, Madraiwiwi praised the Commonwealth of Nations. "The strength of Commonwealth lies in its diversity and it to be mindful of bearing economic, social, political and cultural systems which comprise its membership," he said. 'Its commonality lies in its connection to humanity, in the main it has provided an invariable forum whose members to open and continue meaningful issues of concern."

=== Economic and environmental views ===
On 7 July 2005, Madraiwiwi called on his fellow-chiefs to consider how to maximise the effectiveness of income generated through tourist facilities built on natively owned land. Opening the Tourism Forum at the Sheraton Resort, he said that the annual profit, now more than F$30 million, should be invested to spearhead native Fijian participation in the industry. He also called on leaders to take a more "bipartisan" approach to national issues, saying that as a small country with limited resources, Fiji could ill afford "endless debates about ethnicity and identity." He spoke of the need to break new ground. "We need to move forward and beyond the point where we endlessly pursue the demons bequeathed us by our history," Madraiwiwi said.

Addressing a Greenpeace meeting in Suva on 10 July to commemorate the 20th anniversary of the bombing of the Rainbow Warrior by French DGSE agents in 1985, Madraiwiwi said that while nuclear testing, the issue at the time of the Rainbow Warrior's destruction, was a thing of the past, the region was still faced with major environmental challenges. "Back then the issue of the day was nuclear testing, now we are faced with problems such as climate change, overfishing, deforestation, shipments of radioactive materials through Pacific waters and nuclear proliferation," he said. "We need to remain vigilant so that we won't become victims again." A former Greenpeace board member, Madraiwiwi called on the environmental lobby to remember that "the actions of a few with commitment, can alter the course of world history."

The vice-president has also called for a crusade against corruption, and for streamlining of the Public Service Commission's disciplinary laws to prevent delays in fighting corruption, which only foster further abuse. "Combating it will take courage, determination and perseverance. The most effective means of doing it is by creating a climate not receptive to corruption," Madraiwiwi said at the launch of the Transparency International Fiji book in Suva on 9 December 2005.

=== Views on homosexuality ===
On 31 August 2005, Madraiwiwi became the first high-ranking office-holder in Fiji to call for homosexuality to be legalised. Speaking at the opening of the Fiji Medical Association conference in Suva, he said that while he acknowledged the abhorrence of many great religions towards homosexuality, he thought that what sexual acts people do in private is no business of the state. "Whatever one's views about it, those who choose to practise that lifestyle in private surely have a right to do so," he said. Madraiwiwi's comments flew in the face of pressure from the Methodist and other churches, as well as some Hindu and Muslim organisations, to close the loopholes in the law which allowed a Fijian citizen and a foreigner who had been convicted of homosexual acts to walk free in late August. Madraiwiwi's endorsement of legalised homosexuality also ran contrary to assertions from Prime Minister Laisenia Qarase that so long as he remained in office, homosexuality would remain illegal.

=== Views on Fiji's national identity ===
Speaking at the launch of Fiji Week celebrations on 7 October 2005, Madraiwiwi called on the nation to face up to questions about its fundamental identity. Such issues involved finding an inclusive adjective of nationality, the term "Fijian" being widely thought of as an ethnic term and its use by non-indigenous persons sometimes resented. The choice of a national language, and the question about whether to keep or change the flag, should also be addressed, he said. It would not do any good to avoid facing such questions, he said, because resolving them was essential to fostering true reconciliation and unity in the nation.

=== Poppy Drive speech ===
At the launch of the Poppy Drive on 21 October, Madraiwiwi called on returned servicemen to lay aside old resentments. The general refusal of Indo-Fijians to contribute to the war effort in World War II caused widespread resentment among indigenous Fijians, which has not entirely abated. Madraiwiwi considered, however, that they had shown bravery in their own way, enduring mistreatment "with fortitude and grace" at the hands of their colonial masters, to whom "they had little reason to be grateful." He also challenged people to consider the question of how the economy could have survived had the Indo-Fijians left Fiji for the war. "Who would have planted the cane, run the mills and funded the colony if they had gone to battle?" he asked.

In the same address, the vice-president said that only those who had experienced the horrors of war could truly appreciate the value of freedom. A generation had grown up taking freedom for granted, he said, but owed a debt of gratitude that could never be repaid to those who had paid the price with their blood. He also said that people have become bolder in asserting their rights, but cautioned that that is one of the causes of wars.

=== Thoughts on the Fijian electoral system ===
- See main articles: Electoral system of Fiji; Voting system of Fiji.

On 3 November 2005, Madraiwiwi expressed reservations about the so-called Alternative Vote, which incorporates elements of instant run-off voting and electoral fusion, which has been used in Fiji for the past two elections. The system allows political parties and candidates to combine their votes in a constituency according to a prearranged ranking of "preferences." Although voters may customise the ranking, few did so at the last two elections, and many were reportedly unaware that a vote cast for the party of their choice might end up being transferred to a party they might have no wish to support. Madraiwiwi said that in practice, voting for a party meant voting for any other party to which that party had agreed to transfer its "preferences." He considered that this compromised the voter's freedom of choice, and that in retrospect, it might have been better to retain the first past the post system that was formerly used.

At a workshop organised by the Citizens Constitutional Forum in Suva, Madraiwiwi endorsed calls for electoral reform on 9 February 2006. Madraiwiwi, who was the chief guest at the forum, called for a reduction in the number of communal constituencies (elected on ethnic rolls, almost two-thirds of the present House of Representatives) and a corresponding increase in the number of open constituencies (elected by universal suffrage). Communal voting reinforced the ethnic faultline that characterised elections in Fiji, he said, and steps should be taken to move away from it.

The vice-president also reiterated his earlier reservations about the Fijian electoral system. It was not well understood by less literate sections of the population, he said, and though its purpose was to encourage coalition-building, it was open to manipulation and a simpler voting system, which would be fair and neutral, should be considered, the Fiji Live and Fiji Village news services reported him as saying. He proposed proportional representation for as an option which would reflect the composition of the Fijian electorate. The constitutional requirement for multi-party coalitions, which has never been implemented strictly as stipulated, should also be reconsidered, he said.

In a rare display of unity, both Tomasi Vakatora of the predominantly indigenous Grand Coalition Initiative Group and Krishna Datt of the mainly Indo-Fijian Fiji Labour Party both rejected the Vice-President's calls for proportional representation, saying they were satisfied with the present electoral system.

Madraiwiwi also expressed concern about how the high level of Indo-Fijian emigration could create electoral disparity, affecting the election results in marginal open constituencies.

=== Critique of ethnic politics ===
In his opening address to the Pacific Islands Political Studies Association (PIPSA) conference on 24 November 2005, Madraiwiwi described race relations as "a work in progress." He lamented the ethnic faultline that defines Fijian politics, a situation reinforced, he said, by what political parties thought the electorate wanted. The electoral system, in which almost two-thirds of the seats in the House of Representatives are chosen by voters registered on closed ethnic rolls, further reinforced this divide, he maintained. The result was that people retreated into their "ethnic fortresses" and viewed one another with suspicion.

Madraiwiwi spoke of the need to build personal relationships on the basis of trust, across ethnic lines. "We must begin to trust each other if this country is to progress the way we want it to. But before that we have to lay the preparatory work to engender that trust by building relationships every day," he declared.

One factor gave the vice-president cause for optimism. The indigenous population was growing somewhat faster than that of the nation as a whole, which he thought would gradually allay their fears of marginalisation and could lead to their being less fearful about being led by someone of a different ethnic group.

=== Views on the place of the Fijian language ===
- See main article: National language debate in Fiji.

Addressing the 72nd annual meeting of the Fijian Teachers Association in Suva on 9 January 2006, Madraiwiwi added his own voice to calls for the Fijian language to be made a compulsory subject in all primary schools. His parents' generation had emphasised prioritising English on the assumption that Fijian could be learned later, but this had resulted in a generation knowing little Fijian, and unless the language was made compulsory at all levels of primary education, it would be lost to the next generation, Madraiwiwi said.

== Achievements ==
In his capacity of Acting President of Fiji, Madraiwiwi succeeded in brokering a truce on 16 January 2006 between Prime Minister Laisenia Qarase and Military Commander Commodore Frank Bainimarama, whose long-running feud had raised fears of civil unrest or a military coup. Under Madraiwiwi's mediation, each side made some concessions to the other, and observers were cautiously optimistic that Fiji had been pulled back from the brink. Although the truce eventually broke down, it postponed the coup that eventually took place on 5 December.

== Personal life ==
Ratu Madraiwiwi is the eldest son of Doctor Ratu Jione Atonio Rabici Doviverata, who preceded him as Roko Tui Bau in 1995. His mother, Adi Losalini Raravuya Uluiviti was from the chiefly Tu'i Nairai family, in Fiji's Lomaiviti province. She was one of the first women to become a member of Fiji's Legislative Council and subsequently a Member of Parliament.

Ratu Madraiwiwi is a grandson of Ratu Joni Madraiwiwi (1859–1920), a Bauan chief, and a great-great-grandson of Ratu Seru Epenisa Cakobau (1815–1883), the Fijian monarch who unified the nation under his leadership before ceding the islands to the United Kingdom in 1874. He is also a nephew of Ratu Sir Lala Sukuna (1888–1958), who forged embryonic institutions for what would become the independent nation of Fiji, although he did not live to see it. On 5 December 1998, he married Adi Lusi Tuivanuavou, also known as Adi Lusiana Paluvavau Qolikoro, on Bau Island in Fiji.

Madraiwiwi died on 29 September 2016 after a short illness. He was later laid to rest at the Sau Tabu in Bau Island on 7 October 2016 a week after his death. His death was attended by The King of Tonga King Tupou VI and other Chiefly families around Fiji.

Political offices
Preceded by Ratu Jope Seniloli	Vice-President of Fiji; 2004–2006	Succeeded by Epeli Nailatikau
Preceded by Ratu Dr. Jione Atonio Rabici Doviverata	Roko Tui Bau; 1995–2016	Succeeded by vacant
