= Syzygium richii =

Conservation status
- Least Concern (IUCN 3.1)

Scientific classification
- Kingdom: Plantae
- Clade: Tracheophytes
- Clade: Angiosperms
- Clade: Eudicots
- Clade: Rosids
- Order: Myrtales
- Family: Myrtaceae
- Genus: Syzygium
- Species: S. richii

Binomial name
- Syzygium richii (A.Gray) Merr. & L.M.Perry (1942)

Synonyms
- Eugenia richii A.Gray (1854); Jambosa richii (A.Gray) Müll.Berol. (1858)

Species of flowering plant

Syzygium richii is a species of flowering plant in the myrtle family, Myrtaceae. It is a tree or shrub native to Fiji, Tonga, and Vanuatu.

Syzygium richii is a shrub or small tree growing up to 10 meters tall. It is most often found in shoreline and coastal strand vegetation, and occasionally in lowland and secondary forest, generally below 100 and occasionally up to 300 meters elevation.
