= Vatanitawake =

Ceremonial mound in Fiji

Vatanitawake (Transl. "shelf for flags") or Navatanitawake is a ceremonial mound on the island of Bau in Fiji. It was originally built as a temple to worship Ratu Mai Bulu, the ancestral deity (kalou vu) of the Kubuna people. It later became the foundation of the meeting house on Bau. In 1970, when the Council House was being rebuilt, archaeologist Aubrey Parke led an excavation of the Vatanitawake.

== History ==
Vueti and his descendants used the mound to spread their flags (tawake) after sailing expeditions.

The temple was destroyed in a fire in 1837. It was rebuilt in 1840 by the secular chief, the Vunivalu, who then dedicated it to Cagawalu, the war god of Bau, in addition to Ratu Mai Bulu.

== See also ==
- Culture of Fiji
