= Litiana Maopa =

Adi Litiana Maopa (1864-1933) was a prominent member of two of Fiji's main chiefly houses, those of the Tui Nayau, the paramount chief of the Lau Islands, and the chiefly house of the Vunivalu of Bau the paramount chief of the Kubuna Confederacy.

Adi Maopa came from a very important background. Her father, Ratu Tevita Uluilakeba II, was meant to become the Tui Nayau. This is a very high title, meaning the paramount chief of the Lau Islands. Sadly, her father died before he could take on this role. Because of this, Adi Maopa was part of the ruling Vuanirewa dynasty. This was a noble family known as Matailakeba. Her Mother was Adi Asenaca Kakua Vuikaba, Who was a daughter of Ratu Seru Epenisa Cakobau and Adi Litia Samanunu.

She married Ratu Joni Madraiwiwi who was a colonial administrator that served as Roko Tui for Bua, Tailevu, and Ra. Together they had 8 kids:

- Ratu Josefa Lalabalavu Vana'ali'ali Sukuna, who was a Speaker of the legislative assembly.
- Kuini Vuikaba Teimumu, who is the Grandmother of Kuini Speed.
- Ratu Tiale Wimbledon Thomas Vuiyasawa who was a member of the fijian senate.
- Asilina Liliwaimanu Davila who is the Mother-in-law of Fijian Politician and Chief Sir Penaia Ganilau.
- Jone Sovadra.
- Adi Salote Mokoiwaqa
- Adi Mere Tawakula
- Ratu Jioni Atonio Rabici Doviverata who is the father of the late former vice-president of fiji, Joni Madraiwiwi
