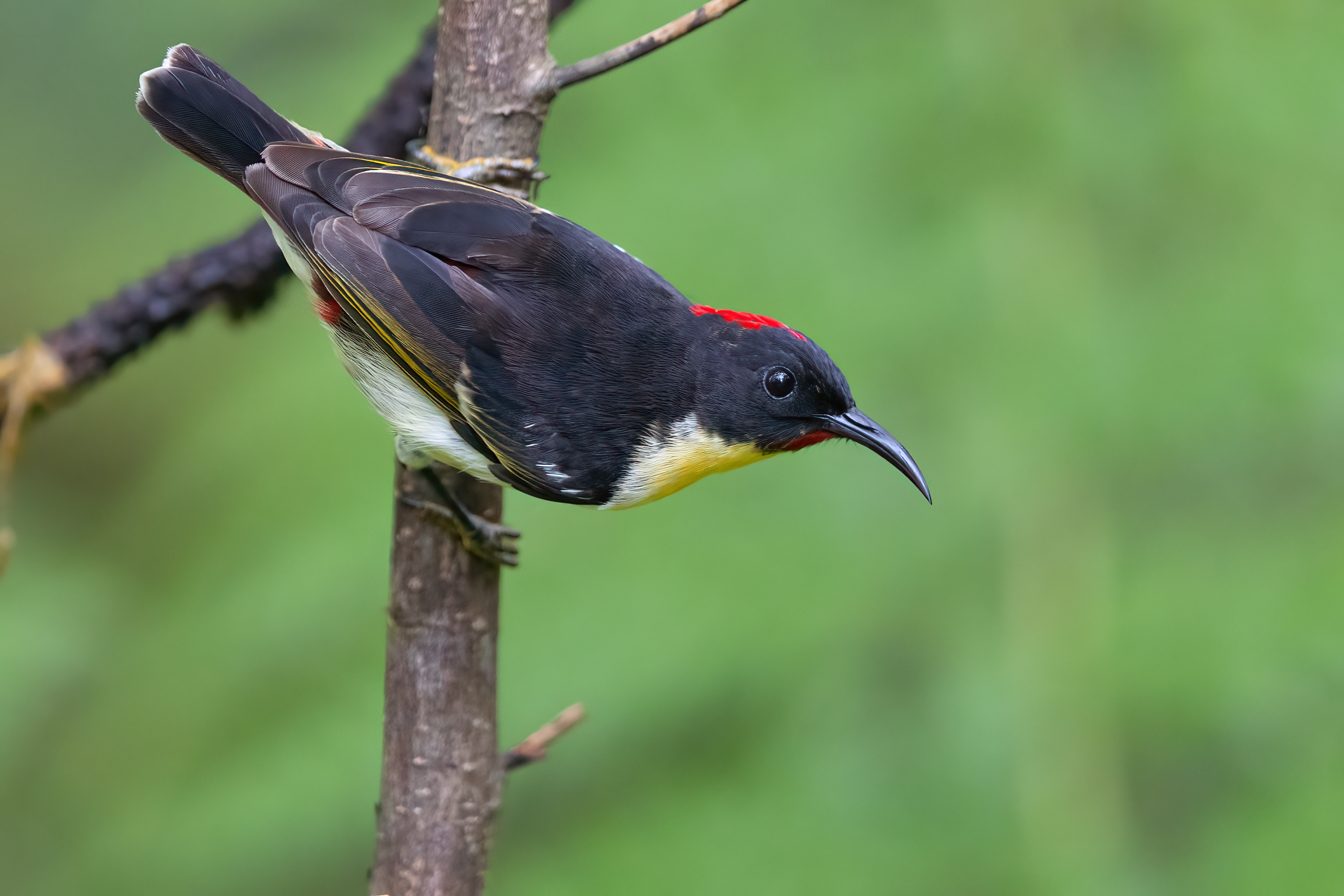

Conservation status
- Least Concern (IUCN 3.1)

Scientific classification
- Kingdom: Animalia
- Phylum: Chordata
- Class: Aves
- Order: Passeriformes
- Family: Meliphagidae
- Genus: Myzomela
- Species: M. jugularis

Binomial name
- Myzomela jugularis Peale, 1849

= Sulphur-breasted myzomela =

Species of bird

The sulphur-breasted myzomela (Myzomela jugularis), also known as the orange-breasted myzomela or orange-breasted honeyeater, is a species of bird in the family Meliphagidae.

== Description ==
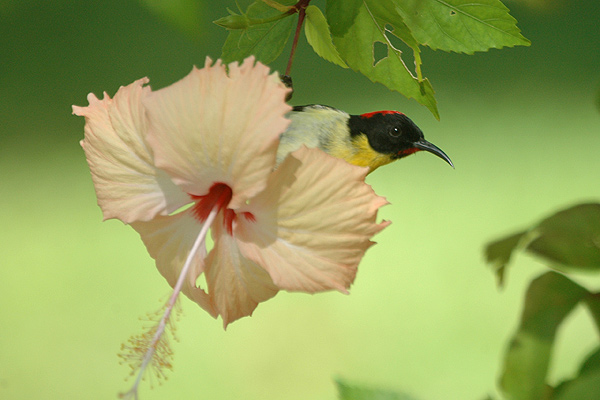
male, Caqalai Island, Ovalau, Fiji Isles

The sulphur-breasted myzomela is 10 cm (4 in) long. The upperparts are black with a scarlet rump. The underparts are pale yellow-white. The curved bill and feet are black. The male has a scarlet crown.

== Distribution and habitat ==
The sulphur-breasted myzomela is endemic to Fiji, where it is the smallest resident avian species. It breeds on all the islands except Rotuma. It is a familiar bird in gardens as well as rural forest and mangrove habitats, and also among coconut trees in disturbed areas. Its natural habitats are tropical moist lowland forests and subtropical or tropical mangrove forests.

== Breeding ==
The small nest is composed of root fibres and hidden in shrubby vegetation. A clutch of two eggs, pale pink with brown spots, is laid, and then incubated for around 14 days.

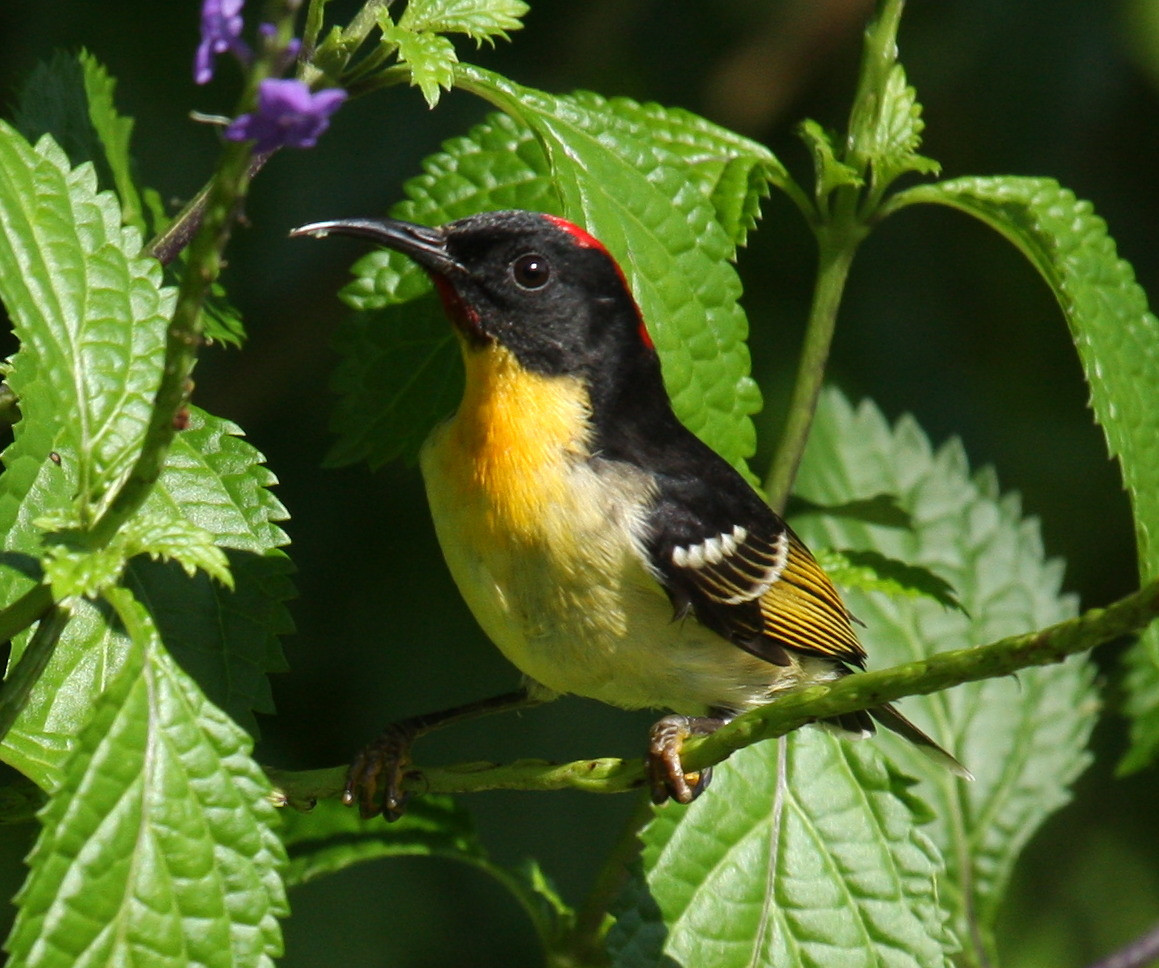
male, De Voeux Peak, Taveuni, Fiji Isles
