= Popi Seniloli =

Fijian chief (1883–1936)

Ratu Popi Seniloli

Vunivalu of Bau
- In office 1914–1936
- Preceded by: Penaia Kadavulevu
- Succeeded by: Tevita Naulivou

Roko Tui of Tailevu Province
- In office 1920–1936
- Preceded by: Joni Madraiwiwi I
- Succeeded by: Isireli Tawake

Nominated Member of the Legislative Council
- In office –1936

Personal details
- Born: 1883
- Died: 11 October 1936 (aged 52–53)

Ratu Popi Epeli Cakobau (1883–11 October 1936) was a Fijian chief and politician. He held the title of Vunivalu of Bau from 1914 until his death in 1936, and was also a nominated member of the Legislative Council.

== Biography ==
Born Popi Epeli Senioli, he was the son of Josefa Celua, who was the third son of the Tui Viti Seru Epenisa Cakobau and Litia Samanunu. Ratu Popi inherited the title from his cousin, Penaia Kadavulevu in 1914.

Like his predecessor, Ratu Popi was a parliamentarian in the Legislative Council of Fiji. After his death in 1936, it is argued that his eldest son Tevita Naulivou inherited the title of Vunivalu, after whom it transferred to another son, George Cakobau.

Popi and his wife Adi Torika were Christian converts.

In 1934 he changed his name by deed poll to Popi Epeli Cakobau. In the same year he was made a Justice of the Peace.
