= Diospyros vitiensis =

Scientific classification
- Kingdom: Plantae
- Clade: Tracheophytes
- Clade: Angiosperms
- Clade: Eudicots
- Clade: Asterids
- Order: Ericales
- Family: Ebenaceae
- Genus: Diospyros
- Species: D. vitiensis

Binomial name
- Diospyros vitiensis (Fosberg) Kosterm.

Synonyms
- D. vitiensis var. longisepala.: Diospyros longisepala Gillespie; Diospyros globosa (A.C.Sm.) Fosberg; Diospyros samoensis var. longisepala (Gillespie) Fosberg; Maba globosa A.C.Sm.

Species of tree

Diospyros vitiensis is a species of tree in the family Ebenaceae. It is endemic to Fiji.
