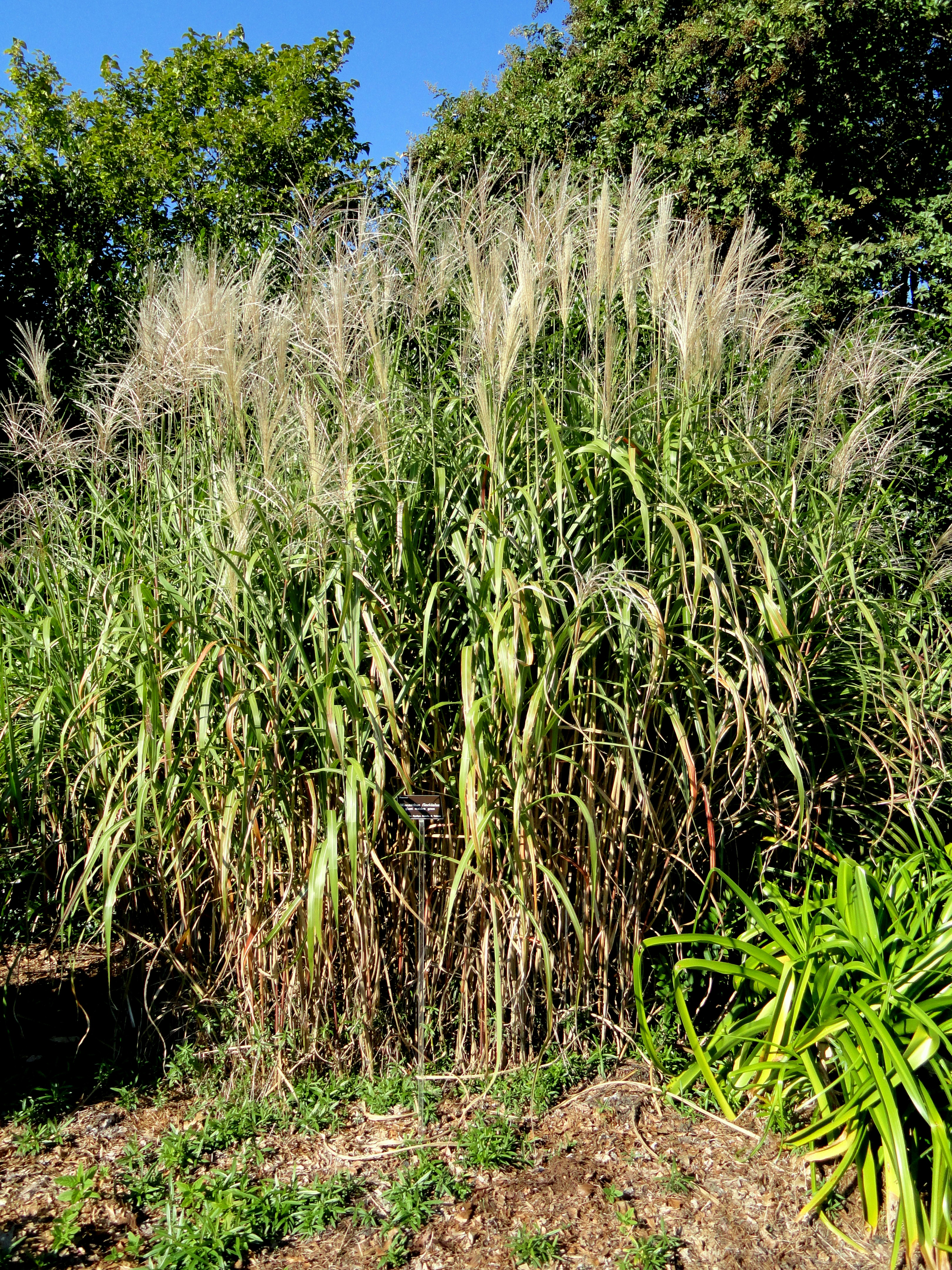

Scientific classification
- Kingdom: Plantae
- Clade: Tracheophytes
- Clade: Angiosperms
- Clade: Monocots
- Clade: Commelinids
- Order: Poales
- Family: Poaceae
- Subfamily: Panicoideae
- Genus: Miscanthus
- Species: M. floridulus

Binomial name
- Miscanthus floridulus (Labill.) Warb. ex K.Schum. & Lauterb.

Synonyms
- Synonymy: Erianthus floridulus (Labill.) Schult. & Schult.f.; Eulalia densa (Nees) Munro; Miscanthus formosanus A.Camus; Miscanthus japonicus Andersson; Miscanthus luzonensis Andersson; Miscanthus ryukyuensis Honda; Saccharum densum Nees; Saccharum distichophyllum Steud. ex Jard.; Saccharum floridulum Labill.; Saccharum japonicum Houtt.; Saccharum praegrande Steud.; Xiphagrostis floridula (Labill.) Coville

= Miscanthus floridulus =

Species of grass

Miscanthus floridulus, the Pacific Island silvergrass, is a species of perennial grass in the family Poaceae.

== Range ==
Miscanthus floridulus is native to parts of eastern and southeastern Asia and the Pacific islands.

It is native to southern China, Laos, Vietnam, Myanmar, and Peninsular Malaysia on the Asian mainland, and to Japan, the Ryukyu Islands, Taiwan, Hainan, the Philippines, Sumatra, Java, the Lesser Sunda Islands, Sulawesi, Maluku, and New Guinea, the Bismarck Archipelago, Solomon Islands, Vanuatu, New Caledonia, and Fiji, as well as parts of Micronesia (Caroline Islands, Marshall Islands, and Gilbert Islands) and Polynesia (Cook Islands, Marquesas Islands, Niue, Samoan Islands, Society Islands, Tonga, Tuamotu Archipelago, Tubuai Islands, and Wallis and Futuna).

It has been introduced to Hawaii and the Mariana Islands, and to Arkansas and Missouri in the mainland United States.

== Use ==
In the Highlands Region of Papua New Guinea, this grass is locally known as pit pit grass, and grows naturally. The local communities use the stem of this grass for several purposes. The matured stem is used to make fences around gardens. It is also used to construct the outer wall of traditional houses. The third important use is that remote households burn dried stems to light their houses. Also, children who walk to school carry torches from the burning stem of this grass until they reach their destination. A torch is about 1–2 m (3.3–6.6 ft) long and it takes quite a while to burn it down. The walking distance is long where the children start their journey as early as 5 am.
