= Penaia Kadavulevu =

Fijian cricketer and politician

Ratu Penaia Kadavulevu
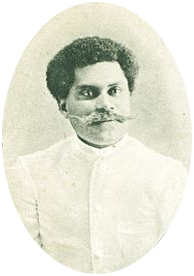

Personal information
- Full name: Penaia Kadavulevu
- Batting: Right-handed
- Bowling: Right-arm fast-medium
- Relatives: Feretareki Temesia (brother-in-law)

Career statistics
Competition	First-class
Matches	6
Runs scored	52
Batting average	4.72
100s/50s	–/–
Top score	25
Balls bowled	192
Wickets	5
Bowling average	17.40
5 wickets in innings	–
10 wickets in match	–
Best bowling	3/30
Catches/stumpings	4/–
- Source: Cricinfo, 25 September 2011

Ratu Penaia Kadavulevu (? – 1914) was a Fijian chief and politician, as well as a renowned cricketer.

== Biography ==
The son of Ratu Epeli Nailatikau I, he inherited the title of Vunivalu of Bau, the paramount chief of the Kubuna Confederacy, upon his father's death in 1901.

The school Ratu Kadavulevu School was founded by him and later named in his honour. The school has produced a number of notable alumni.

Ratu Penaia was a parliamentarian in the Legislative Council of Fiji.

== Sports ==
Ratu Kadavulevu was a talented and keen cricketer and represented Fiji in the sport. Kadavulevu made six first-class appearances for Fiji in 1895 when they toured New Zealand in 1895. In his six first-class matches on that tour, he took 5 wickets at an average of 17.40, with best figures of 3/30. With the bat, he scored 52 runs at a low batting average of 4.72, with a high score of 25.

In 1908, Ratu Kadavulevu was invited by Melbourne Savage Club, Vice President, John Huson Marden, to bring a team of Fijian cricketers to Australia, where they played a match against the Savage members at the East Melbourne Cricket Ground. That evening, the Savage Club, entertained the Fijian visitors at a black tie 'Smoke Night', which they attended in national dress, sang national songs, performed the meke wau dance and conducted a kava ceremony.

Preceded by Ratu Epeli Nailatikau I	Vunivalu of Bau; 1901 - 1914	Succeeded by Ratu Popi Seniloli

Preceded by Ratu Epeli Nailatikau I	Roko Tui Tailevu; 1901–1912	Succeeded by Ratu Joni Madraiwiwi I
