= Fiji Week =

Week of festivities celebrating Fiji's independence

Fiji Day
- Observed by: Fiji
- Significance: anniversary of independence in 1970
- Date: 10 October
- Next time: 10 October 2025
- Frequency: annual

Fiji Week is a week of festivities culminating in Fiji Day on 10 October (the anniversary of Fiji's independence from British colonial rule in 1970) annually. A different theme is chosen every year, but common elements include religious ceremonies and cultural performances.

The preceding week to Fiji Day is called Fiji Week. Fiji Day is October 10 and that is a double anniversary for the nation. On that date in 1874, King Seru Epenisa Cakobau ceded Fiji to the United Kingdom. On the same date in 1970, Fiji regained its independence.

During Fiji Week, the nation celebrates its unity and religious and cultural diversity with performances and programs each day focused on the two main ethnic cultures — Fijan and Indian. The Christian, Muslim, and Hindu religions celebrate their traditions. A different theme is chosen every year, but common elements include religious ceremonies and cultural performances.

In Fiji Week, 2004, the festivities were undermined by a boycott by several prominent politicians and other public figures, who accused the government of using the occasion to promote a political agenda.

== See also ==
- Fiji Week, 2004
- Fiji Week, 2005
