= Epeli Kanakana =

Fijian chief

Ratu Epeli Kanakana (died June 2010) was a Fijian chief. He held the title of Tui Suva, and was the traditional ruler of the area that includes the city of Suva, the nation's capital. The title of Tui Suva is only kept within the Naivutuvutu family of the Tokatoka Solia of Mataqali Vuanimocelolo of the Yavusa Vatuwaqa.

In 2008 he was involved with a land dispute with the Suva City Council over land occupied by a squatter settlement but claimed by the state. He challenged the state's claim to the land in court, claiming that his lands were taken and held unlawfully by the British Crown. In December 2010 the High Court of Fiji ruled against him, finding that native title to the Suva peninsula had been extinguished.
