= Eroni Loganimoce =

Fijian cricketer (born 1930)

Personal information
- Born: 6 October 1930; Tubou, Lau Islands, Fiji
- Bowling: Right-arm medium

International information
- National side: Fiji

Career statistics
Competition	FC
Matches	3
Runs scored	31
Batting average	7.75
100s/50s	–/–
Top score	22
Balls bowled	312
Wickets	5
Bowling average	35.40
5 wickets in innings	–
10 wickets in match	–
Best bowling	2/45
Catches/stumpings	3/–
- Source: Cricinfo, 14 March 2010

Eroni Loganimoce (born October 6, 1930, date of death unknown) was a Fijian cricketer. Loganimoce was a right-arm medium pace bowler.

Loganimoce made his first-class debut for Fiji in 1954 against Canterbury during Fiji's 1953/54 tour of New Zealand. During the tour he played two further first-class matches, with his final first-class match for Fiji coming against Auckland.

In his 3 first-class matches for Fiji he scored 31 runs at a batting average of 7.75, with a high score of 22. With the ball he took 5 wickets at a bowling average of 35.40, with best figures of 2/45. In the field Loganimoce took 3 catches.

Loganimoce also represented Fiji in 58 non first-class matches from 1954 to 1978, with his final match for Fiji coming against Franklin, 24 years after his debut for Fiji in 1954.

Loganimoce is deceased.
