= Epeli Nailatikau I =

Fijian chief

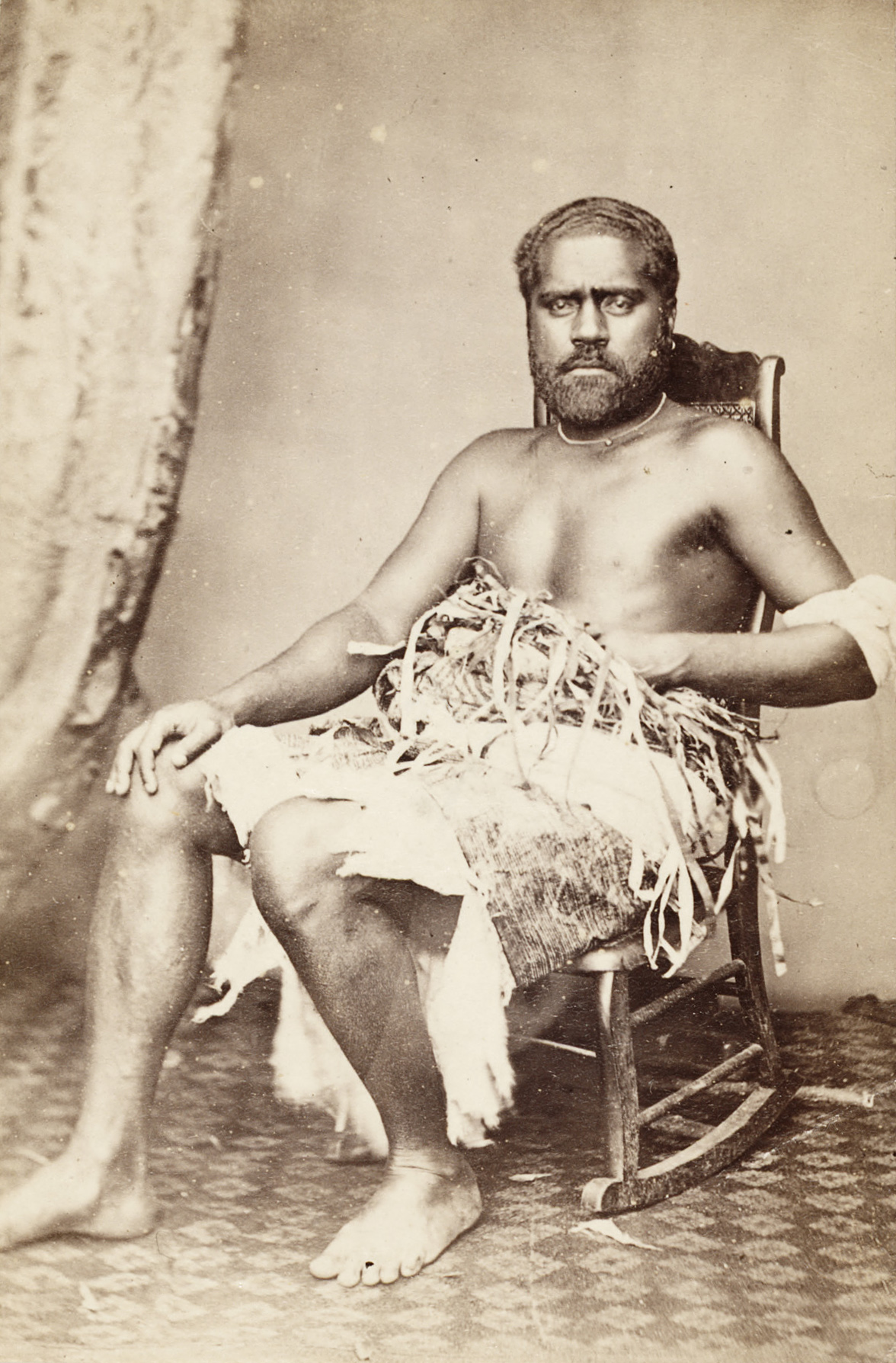
Formal portrait of Ratu Epeli Nailatikau I

Ratu Epeli Nailatikau I (c. 1842 – 1901) was a Fijian Paramount Chief, who was posthumously made the Vunivalu of Bau.

== Biography ==
He was the eldest son of the first Tui Viti, Ratu Seru Epenisa Cakobau and his first wife, Adi Litia Samanunu, daughter of the Roko Tui Bau.

He acted as his father's right-hand man in the Bauan struggles for power, and was subsequently made a governor of many of the Fijian states, (including being made the Roko Tui Tailevu) and a minister in various early portfolios. He was also a signatory to the 1874 Deed of Cession to Great Britain (see Fiji's Cession to Great Britain).

Ratu Epeli's eldest son, Ratu Penaia Kadavulevu inherited the title of Vunivalu, while his second daughter, Adi Moce was the wife of Ratu Alifereti Finau Ulugalala and the grandmother of Fiji's Founding Father, Ratu Sir Kamisese Mara.

Preceded by Ratu Seru Epenisa Cakobau	Vunivalu of Bau; 1883 - 1901	Succeeded by Ratu Penaia Kadavulevu
