= Pacific Regional Workshop on Leadership Development =

Workshop held in 2005 in Fiji

- Date: July 7–9, 2005
- Location: Lami, near Suva, Fiji
- Theme: Leadership Development
- Participants: Approximately 60 delegates from more than 14 Pacific countries
- Outcome: Establishment of the "Pacific Leadership Development Network"

The Pacific Regional Workshop on Leadership Development was held in Lami, near Suva, in 2005. The Workshop was prepared by the Governance Program at the University of the South Pacific, with financial assistance from NZ Aid. Approximately 60 participants from more than 14 Pacific countries, having considered the challenges of leadership facing the Pacific region in a variety of sectors, crafted a statement calling the region's leaders to be more attentive to the needs of Pacific people. The statement reads:

"We the delegates of the Pacific Regional Workshop on Leadership Development held July 7–9, 2005, in Suva, have listened to the many ‘Voices from the Pacific’ and discussed many leadership issues in various sectors. We acknowledge and applaud many good leaders who seek to serve the people in all aspects of our societies. Equally, the detrimental effects of poor leadership are of concern to all of us. Recalling the Pacific Vision adopted by the Pacific Leaders in Auckland on 6th April 2004, we firmly believe :

- that good leadership is vital in all of our sectors and will greatly impact the lives of our people and the well-being of our nations;
- that investing in and developing leaders is vital for our survival and future happiness;
- that leadership development opportunities must be widely and equally available to all irrespective of race, colour, creed, political beliefs or gender; and,
- we the delegates personally accept the challenge to support leadership development activities in our own countries.

Further, we respectfully ask the Pacific Forum Leaders to hear our support for the ‘Pacific Vision’ and our call for their endorsement by supporting and investing in culturally appropriate leadership development initiatives that will help make the ‘Pacific Vision’ a reality. Kiribati, FSM, Samoa, Nauru, PNG, Fiji, Solomon Islands, Tonga, Vanuatu, Palau, Marshall Islands, Cook Islands, Tuvalu, Niue, Tokelau."

Subsequent to this meeting, the University of the South Pacific established a "Pacific Leadership Development Network", which held its first meeting in March 2007.
