= Fiji Week, 2004 =

Fiji Week was a week of prayer meetings and multicultural programmes that took place the week of 4–11 October 2004. Organized at a cost of US$410,000 by a multiracial national committee chaired by the Prime Minister, Laisenia Qarase, Fiji Week was intended to foster reconciliation among Fiji's diverse ethnic communities, especially native Fijians and Indo-Fijians, whose mutual rivalry for political power has dominated Fijian politics for the last generation, and whose relationship has been especially strained since the overthrow of the Indo-Fijian-led government of Mahendra Chaudhry by ethnic Fijian nationalists in the Fiji coup of 2000. Organizers of Fiji Week hoped that it would help to bring about a sense of closure to those events, but the controversy that it generated made this appear difficult to achieve.

On 15 September 2004, a source close to the government told the Australian Associated Press that George Speight, the chief instigator of the 2000 coup, currently serving life-sentence for treason, had had a change of heart towards the Indo-Fijian community following a religious conversion experience in jail, and that he wished to take part in the Fiji Week activities as a gesture of reconciliation. However, the government refused his request to be allowed to leave his Nukulau Island prison to participate in the observances.

== Aftermath and criticisms of the ceremonies ==
=== Mahendra Chaudhry ===
Fiji Week was politically controversial. The Fiji Labour Party of deposed Prime Minister Chaudhry boycotted the observances, claiming that they were a political ploy aimed at defusing the lingering post-coup ethnic tensions without addressing the real problem, that many of those responsible for organizing and funding the coup remain unidentified and at large. There could be no reconciliation without justice being done, various party spokesmen said. At a personal level, however, a spokesman said on 11 October that Chaudhry would consider meeting Speight and forgiving him - provided that he name the persons responsible for instigating and financing the 2000 coup. As of December 2004, Speight has not done so.

=== Adi Koila Nailatikau ===
Another critic of the ceremonies was Senator Adi Koila Nailatikau, the daughter of the late President Ratu Sir Kamisese Mara, who was deposed in the 2000 coup. Explaining her refusal to participate in the Fiji Week reconciliation ceremonies, Adi Koila (who had been held hostage for 56 days by the instigators of the coup) told the Senate on 23 October 2004 that the reconciliation undertaken would be worthless unless investigations into the coup revealed the truth behind its staging. She expressed anger that individuals implicated in the coup now held senior positions in the government and the diplomatic service.

Adi Koila also said that the reconciliation ceremony was inappropriate because the person who received the whale's tooth and forgave the people in the ceremony at Albert Park (President Ratu Josefa Iloilo) had not been a victim of the May 2000 coup.

Adi Koila wondered aloud why the government had decided to organize the reconciliation ceremonies only after both of her parents had died. "Why was the concept of reconciliation never done for the late Turaga Bale the Tui Nayau (Ratu Mara) or for that matter the late Marama Bale the Roko Tui Dreketi (Ro Adi Lala Mara)?" she demanded. "Was all this conjured overnight immediately after their demise?" she questioned.

Adi Koila declared that there could be no genuine forgiveness until questions were answered about who was involved in organizing and funding the 2000 coup. "An individual will forgive when he or she is ready. There must be truth telling, as to why they participated and who gave the orders," Adi Koila said. "Reconciliation cannot eventuate or materialise until the proper legal procedures have been followed, that is without interference from external forces."

=== Frank Bainimarama ===
On 25 October 2004, Commodore Frank Bainimarama, the Commander of the Armed Forces, added his voice to the criticism of the Fiji Week ceremonies. He said he found it "baffling" that individuals implicated in the 2000 coup had taken part in the ceremonies to apologize and ask forgiveness for their actions, only to turn up in court later and plead innocent. He said that according to Fijian culture, an apology was tantamount to a public admission of guilt, and that the "not guilty" pleas later entered by the same people in court raised justifiable questions about whether their apologies were sincere.

Bainimarama strongly criticized Senator Ratu George Cakobau for saying that citizens unhappy with the government-organized apology and reconciliation ceremonies should leave Fiji. Bainimarama declared that Fiji belonged to all of its citizens, and that no one should feel intimidated by politicians who spit out racist remarks, adding that the Senator would be shocked to find that many of those who refused the apology were ethnic Fijians. He said that democracy and the rule of law were the rule of the day in the 21st century, and that the military would uphold it. His comments drew angry criticism from government politicians who accused him of meddling in politics.

Refusing to be silenced, Bainimarama issued a further statement from Australia on 8 December 2004, condemning the inclusion in the government of persons implicated in the 2000 coup, saying that their presence justified his earlier criticism of the Fiji Week reconciliation ceremonies. "That's why we've always said the reconciliation process was a farce," Bainimarama said. "The 2001 Elections brought back all of George Speight's group except him."
