= Pacific Islands Political Studies Association =

International academic body

The Pacific Islands Political Studies Association (PIPSA) is an international academic body dedicated to the study of Pacific Islands states and territories, focusing on their societies, politics, systems of government, international relations and geopolitics.

== Leadership ==
The current executive, as of March 2025, is: President: Professor Transform Aqorau, Vice-Chancellor, Solomon Islands National University. Immediate Past President: Professor Stephanie Lawson, Macquarie University. Vice-Presidents: Dr Mercy Masta, Australian National University. Dr Anthony Tutugoro, L’université de la Nouvelle-Calédonie. Secretary: Ms Mengdi Zhang, Victoria University of Wellington. Executive Committee Members: Associate Professor Nicole George, University of Queensland. Mr Priestley Habru, University of Adelaide. Mr Romitesh Kant, Australian National University. Associate Professor Anna Powles, Massey University.

== History ==
The first ever event was at Brigham Young University (BYU) campus in Hawaii in 1987 where a conference was held among a group of scholars of the Pacific Islands who recognised the need to stimulate and coordinate research and other academic activities to develop knowledge and understanding of the region. The name 'Pacific Island Political Studies Association' originated at that meeting.

== Membership ==
While the majority of PIPSA’s members are academics, members also come from the ranks of aid workers, business people, the clergy, military officers, politicians and public servants. Membership of PIPSA is informal and calculated on attendance at PIPSA conferences. At the 2025 conference, held at Victoria University of Wellington, NZ, in February 2025 there were approximately 200 attendees, some 85 of whom delivered presentations.

== Activities ==
PIPSA’s principal activity is a biennial conference held at different locations around the Pacific. PIPSA Conferences have so far been held in Hawai'i, Australia, the Cook Islands, Guam, Palau, New Caledonia, New Zealand, Samoa, Tahiti and Niue. The next conference is expected to be held at the Solomon Islands National University in 2027.

== Publications ==
Papers from the PIPSA conference held in Rarotonga in 1993 were published in a volume called New Politics in the South Pacific (1994).

The fifth PIPSA conference, held in Palau in 1996, resulted in the publication of Leadership in the Pacific Islands: Tradition and the Future (1998), edited by Don Shuster, Peter Lamour and Karin von Strokirch (subsidized by Palauan chief Roman Tmetuchl).

Following the 2016 conference in Niue, a special issue on 'Pacific Regional Politics', edited by Stephanie Lawson, was published in The Round Table, 106 (2), 2017.
