= Epeli Niudamu =

Fijian politician

Ratu Epeli Niudamu is a Fijian Chief, soldier, and former political leader. The Paramount Chief of one of the four tikinas (districts) of Ra Province, he holds the title of Tui Nalawa. From 1996 to 2006, he represented the Province of Ra in the Senate as a nominee of the Great Council of Chiefs. He was formerly a member of the GCC, but was forced to give up his membership when he was nominated to the Senate.

In his military career, Niudamu served with Fijian soldiers serving with peacekeeping forces in Lebanon.

In September 2017 he was convicted, along with 13 other people, of sedition for attempting to form a breakaway Christian state. He was given a two year suspended sentence.

In November 2019 he was made a member of the Order of Fiji.
