= Finau =

Finau is a surname. Notable people with the surname include:

- Fili Finau (born 1972), Tongan-born Australian rugby union player
- Inga Finau (born 1994), New Zealand rugby union player
- Lupeti Finau (died 1979), Tongan civil servant and politician
- Moʻale Finau (born 1960), Tongan politician
- Molitoni Finau (1883–1965), Tongan politician
- Peni Finau (born 1981), Fiji footballer
- Salesi Finau (born 1973), Tongan rugby footballer
- Tevita Finau (born 1986), New Zealand-born American football player
- Tomiteau Finau (died 1984), Tongan civil servant, lawyer and politician
- Tony Finau (born 1989), American golfer
