= Lala Sukuna =

Fijian chief and soldier (1888–1958)

His Excellency The Honourable Sir Lala Sukuna KCMG KBE
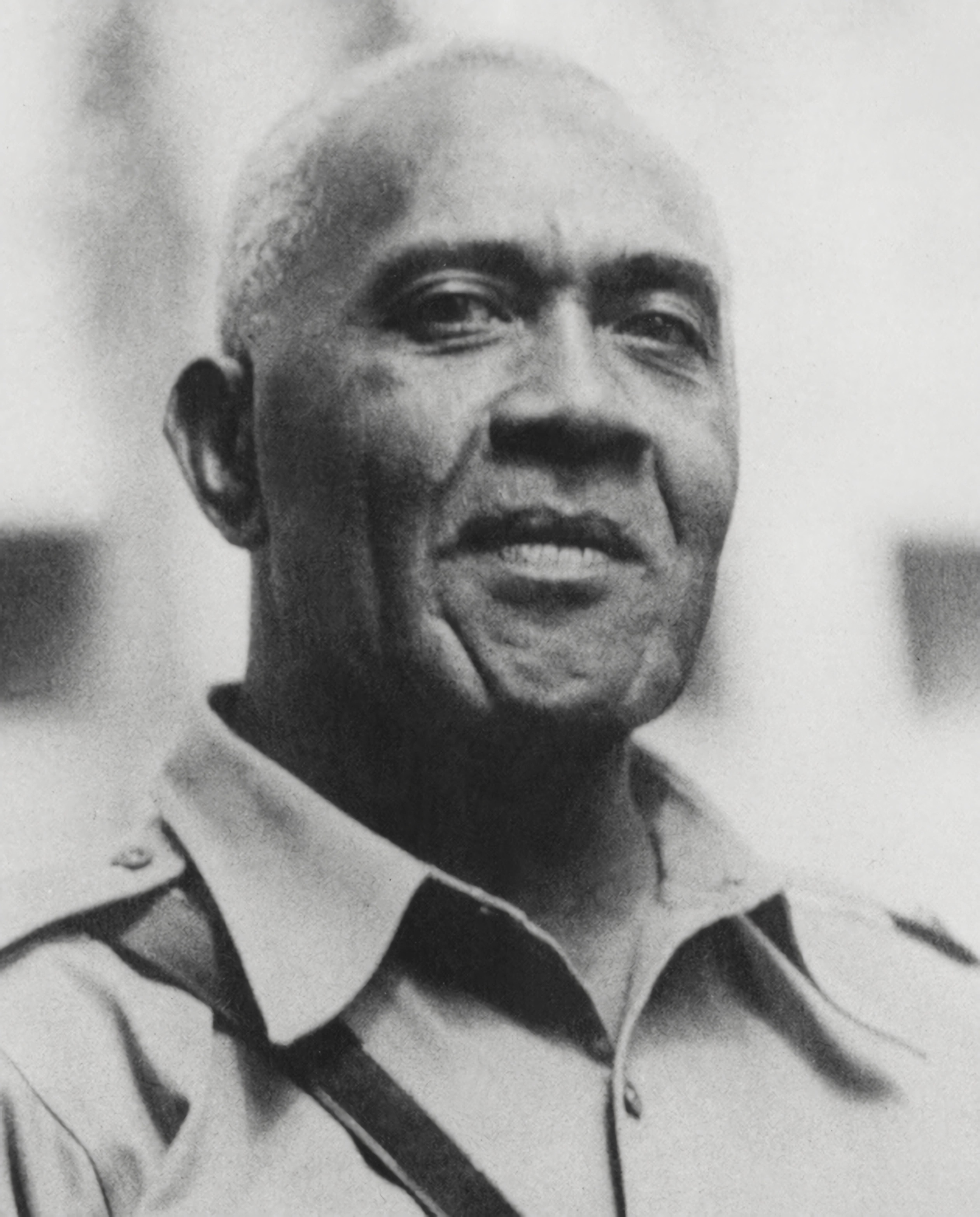

Speaker of the Legislative Council
- In office September 1956 – May 30, 1958 (Died in Office)
- Appointed by: Sir Ronald Garvey
- Monarch: Elizabeth II
- Governor-General: Sir Ronald Garvey
- Preceded by: Position Established
- Succeeded by: Maurice Scott

Member of the Legislative Council
- In office 1932 – May 30, 1958
- Monarchs: George V Edward VIII; George VI; Elizabeth II
- Governors-General: Murchison Fletcher; Arthur Richards; Harry Luke; Philip Mitchell; Alexander Grantham; Brian Freeston; Ronald Garvey
- Preceded by: Joni Madraiwiwi I His Father.
- Succeeded by: Ratu Sir Kamisese Mara His Nephew

Personal details
- Born: April 22, 1888. Bau (island)
- Died: May 30, 1958. SS Arcadian
- Resting place: Tubou, Lakeba, Fiji
- Spouse: Adi Maraia Vosawale Died (m. 1950, died) Adi Maca Likutabua Widowed (m. 1952–1958)
- Education: University of Oxford (BA), Middle Temple (LLB)

Military service
- Allegiance: United Kingdom of Great Britain and Ireland; France; Colony of Fiji
- Branch/service: French Foreign Legion; Fijian Labour Corps; Republic of Fiji Military Forces
- Years of service: 1915–1916 French Foreign Legion; 1917–1918 Fijian Labour Corps; 1939–1945 Republic of Fiji Military Forces
- Rank: Lieutenant Colonel (Republic of Fiji Military Forces); Quartermaster sergeant (Fijian Labour Corps); Legionnaire 2e Classe (French Foreign Legion)
- Battles/wars: Western Front World War I; Second Battle of Artois; Second Battle of Champagne; World War I; Solomon Islands campaign; Malayan Emergency

Ratu Sir Josefa Lalabalavu Vanayaliyali Sukuna KCMG KBE (22 April 1888 – 30 May 1958) was a Fijian chief, scholar, soldier, and statesman. He is regarded as the forerunner of the post-independence leadership of Fiji.

== Lineage ==
Sukuna was born into a chiefly family on Bau, off the island of Viti Levu, the largest island in the Fiji archipelago. His father, Ratu Joni Madraiwiwi, was the son of the Bauan noble and rebel leader Ratu Mara Kapaiwai.

After joining the Audit Office as a clerk at an early age, Ratu Madraiwiwi had steadily worked his way up through the civil service, establishing connections along the way that were later to prove decisive in the life of his son. Ratu Sukuna's mother, Adi Litiana Maopa, was the sister of the Tui Nayau, Ratu Alifereti Finau Ulukalala (High Chief of Lau) and father of Ratu Tevita Uluilakeba III, who was the father of Ratu Sir Kamisese Mara.

Ratu Mara Kapaiwai of Bau was born in 1815, son of Ratu Vuibureta and Adi Mere Veisaca. Ratu Vuibureta was the sixth son of Ratu Banuve Baleivavalagi the 3rd Vunivalu of Bau from 1770 to 1803 and Adi Ufia from Lakeba.

Although he was not accorded a chiefly title from Bau his birthplace, he was installed as the second Tui Lau in 1938 following the traditional process of consultation between the Yavusa Vuanirewa and the endorsement of the Tui Nayau, Ratu Tevita Uluilakeba III following the passing of Ratu Alifereti Finau Ulukalala as referenced in the TRY Lakeba. He held the title of Tui Lau until his death in 1958.

== Itaukei Land Trust Board ==
Ratu Sir Lala Sukuna recognized that for Fiji to prosper, the Indian community needed land security, but indigenous ownership must remain permanent. Although he did have disagreements with several leaders such as Peceli Vitukawalu, the Magistrate of Fiji at the time, who said that the indentured labourers brought from India should go back to India, but Sukuna fought back and said that it is the Fijians who took advantage of the indentured labourers leaving them with no money to afford the trip back to India. Between 1936 and 1940, Sukuna travelled extensively across Fiji—often by foot or horse—to meet with chiefs and villagers. He famously persuaded the Great Council of Chiefs (GCC) in 1936 to "surrender" their individual rights to manage their land to a central board for the "national good". The 1940 Act legally codified this "trust," vesting the control of all native land in the Board to be administered for the "benefit of the Fijian owners" while facilitating leases to others.

== Early life ==
Although Sukuna was an indigenous Fijian, his father enrolled him at the Wairuku Indian School in Ra, founded in 1898 by Pandit Badri Maharaj, who later served from 1917 to 1929 as the first Indo-Fijian member of Fiji's Legislative Council (the forerunner to the present Parliament). One of the teachers at the school was the Rev. Charles Andrew. Andrew was a colourful character, an Oxford-educated Anglican clergyman who had converted to Roman Catholicism and then back again, before sailing for the mission field in Fiji. Determined that Sukuna should receive the best education possible, his father arranged for him to receive private tuition from Andrew. He was a strict teacher, beating Sukuna on occasion.

Sukuna proved to be an exceptionally able student; author Deryck Scarr later said of him that he spoke English with "the bell-like tones of standard southern English, as though he had studied diction with the royal family". Largely as a result of Andrew's influence, the Sukuna was sent to Wanganui Collegiate School in Wanganui, New Zealand.

== War hero ==
No Fijians at the time had graduated from a university, and the British colonial administration was unwilling to encourage higher learning for the natives. However, Ratu Madraiwiwi was personally acquainted with the then colonial Governor, Sir Francis Henry May, and in 1911 asked him to try to arrange for his son to study at a British university on the grounds that he had passed the matriculation exams at Wanganui Collegiate School. May's influence persuaded the British Colonial Secretary, reluctantly, to grant Sukuna a one-year leave of absence from his responsibilities in Fiji to study history at Wadham College, Oxford, in 1913. Financial constraints had prevented him from realising his dream of pursuing a four-year law degree at Cambridge.

Ratu Sukuna Tui Lau and other chieftains of Lau in Vanua Balavu, 1918 after service in France and Before he left again for England

World War I broke out and Sukuna applied for enlistment in the British Army. The British government, however, had a policy of refusing enlistment to Fijians. Sukuna enlisted in the French Foreign Legion instead. He was wounded towards the end of 1915 and forced to return to Fiji. He returned to France the following year, however, with the Native Transport Detachment, a newly formed contingent assisting the British Army. Apparently, the British colonial authorities had had a change of heart about native participation in the war. For his wartime service, Ratu Sukuna was awarded the Croix de Guerre.

Ratu Sukuna had no difficulty raising funds for his return to Oxford. Towards the end of 1918, he graduated from the history course that was shortened for returned servicemen. He proceeded to the Middle Temple in London, and by 1921 had graduated with both a BA and an LL.B degree. He thus became the first-ever Fijian to receive a university degree.

== Statesman ==
Sukuna's father died in 1920, and he had to return to Fiji to take his place as head of the mataqali, or clan. He brought with him a tailored isulu, a skirt worn by men, which became Fiji's national dress. He became a chief assistant in the Native Lands Commission in 1922, and a decade later he was stationed in Lomaloma, and also on the island of Lakeba in the Lau Islands, as a district and provincial commissioner. The same year, he was appointed to the Legislative Council to represent the Fijian people. (At that time, non-European members were appointed, rather than elected.) In this capacity, Sukuna attended the coronation of King George VI and Queen Elizabeth in London in 1937.

In 1938, Sukuna was installed as the Tui Lau (Protector of the Tongans of Sawana in Vanuabalavu), a senior chiefly title in the Lau Islands that had been vacant for many years. In many respects, this formalised what had long been the reality that he was the most influential chief in Fiji, notwithstanding the seniority enjoyed by other chiefs. In 1940, he returned to Suva as the Native Lands Reserves Commissioner. That year he was awarded the CBE. In 1942 he set about recruiting Fijian men for the World War II effort. The British government had completely reversed its former position of not permitting natives to enlist, and the Fijian Battalion, commanded by Ratu Edward Cakobau (a relative of Sukuna's) fought with distinction.

One of Ratu Sukuna's greatest achievements was his role in the establishment of the Native Land Trust Board. Most of the land of Fiji was owned by the mataqali, or clans, but worked by Indo-Fijian farmers. Prior to 1940, each clan individually negotiated the terms of leasing the land to those who farmed it, resulting in a wide variation of lease terms. As most landholdings were small, few mataqali were able to develop their plots to any large degree. The then colonial governor, Sir Arthur Gordon, proposed establishing a central body to hold the land in trust and lease it to willing farmers on terms that would be uniform throughout Fiji. The pressing need of the time was to provide land for a growing population of Indo-Fijian farmers, without expropriating it from its Fijian owners, and to do so in a way that was consistent. As early as 1933, Ratu Sukuna had recognised this problem, and had told the Great Council of Chiefs, "We regard the Indian desire for more permanent tenancy as a natural and legitimate consequence an agricultural community settling in any country. But how was this desire to be reconciled with the need to protect the interests of present and future Fijian landowners?" The Native Land Trust Board scheme emerged as a solution.

Persuading the various mataqali to accept the scheme, however, was far from easy. The landowners were being asked to surrender, forever, the control of their land, and entrust its administration to a central authority that would act in the national interest, as well as that of the owners. Ratu Sukuna set about explaining the proposal to every mataqali in Fiji. Rather than rely on radio broadcasts or printed flyers, he determined to take the proposal in person to every village in the country. After a long debate, the Great Council of Chiefs approved the scheme in what Sir Philip Mitchell, the then Governor, described as "one of the greatest acts of faith and trust in colonial history." Sukuna himself was assigned the task of examining each landholding and deciding what portion should be reserved for the present and future needs of the mataqali, and what portion should be made available for leasing.

Meanwhile, Sukuna had become Secretary for Fijian Affairs. In 1944, he reestablished the Native Regulations Board, later renamed the Fijian Affairs Board. Then in 1950, he was appointed as an advisor to the British delegation to the Fourth Committee at Lake Success.

Sukuna was created a Commander of the Most Excellent Order of the British Empire in 1939, and awarded a knighthood in 1946, in recognition of his services to Fiji. After receiving a second knighthood KCMG in 1953, Ratu Sukuna was appointed the first native-born Speaker (politics) of the Legislative Council in 1954. Although it was only partially elected and had few of the powers of the modern Parliament of Fiji, the Legislative Council provided a venue for Fiji's future leaders to gain experience in the workings of government. In 1956, Ratu Sukuna encouraged the formation of Fiji's first political party, the Fijian Association under the leadership of Ratu Edward Cakobau.

== Legacy ==
Lala Sukuna was married twice, first to Adi Maraia Vosawale (1903–1956) in 1928, and later to Maca Likutabua (1934–2000) in September 1957, eight months before his death. Neither marriage produced any children, and his successor as the Tui Lau was his nephew, Ratu Sir Kamisese Mara. The late Adi Alani Sovanatabua (later Dimuri, when she married Ratu Kinivilame Pai Dimuri) was the only child and daughter of Sukuna as a result of a relationship with Roko Melaia Lutukivuya, daughter of Roko Jone Liwaki, the brother of Ratu Alifereti Finau Ulukalala. Sukuna had acknowledged Adi Sovanatabua as his daughter. Roko Melaia Lutukivuya was the first cousin of Ratu Tevita Uluilakeba III and aunt of Ratu Sir Kamisese Mara.

Ratu Sukuna died en route to England on the ship Arcadia, on 30 May 1958. He was buried at the Vatanitawake, the Sau Tabu in Tubou, Lakeba alongside great leaders of Lau.

Fiji's third constitutional President, Ratu Josefa Iloilo, described Ratu Sukuna as "a great and noble man ... whose foresight and vision still impacts on our future."

In May 2026, a library at Wairuku Primary School, which he attended between 1898 and 1901, was dedicated in his name. The official title of the school library is JLV Sukuna Memorial Library.

== Regnal Title ==
Preceded by Enele Ma'afu	Tui Lau; 1938–1958	Succeeded by Ratu Sir Kamisese Mara
