= Tevita Uluilakeba III =

Fijian noble (1898–1966)

- Tui Nayau and Sau ni Vanua
- Born: 4 October 1898
- Died: 4 October 1966 (aged 68)
- Issue: Kamisese Mara

Ratu Tevita Uluilakeba III (October 4, 1898 – October 4, 1966) was the 12th Tui Nayau and Sau ni Vanua of the Lau Islands. He was the father of Ratu Sir Kamisese Mara, founding father of the modern nation of Fiji.

Ratu Te, as he was known, hailed from the chiefly village of Tubou on the island of Lakeba in Lau Province. He became the Tui Nayau upon the death of his father, Ratu Alifereti Finau Ulugalala in 1934. His mother was Adi Ateca Moceiwaqa (or spelled Ateca Moceiwai), paternal granddaughter of Ratu Seru Epenisa Cakobau, the self-proclaimed King of Fiji, and daughter of Ratu Epeli Nailatikau I.

The origin of the Fijian farewell song "Isa Lei" is disputed, and one versions holds that Ratu Tevita Uluilakeba composed it in 1916 for Adi Litia Tavanavanua (1900–1983), when she visited Lakeba in 1916.

== Ratu Tevita's offspring ==
Name	Date of birth	Date of death	Mother's name
Ratu Sir Kamisese Kapaiwai Tuimacilai Uluilakeba Mara	May 6, 1920	April 18, 2004	Lusiana Qolikoro (of Sawana, Lomaloma, Vanuabalavu) [de facto]
Ratu Jone Ukelele Uluilakeba	1922	Unknown	Unaisi Biu Miqawalu (Levuka, Lakeba) [de facto]
Ratu Salesi Kinikinilau Uluilakeba	1924	Unknown	Unaisi Biu Miqawalu (Levuka, Lakeba) [de facto]
Ratu Jone Liwaki Uluilakeba	September 11, 1926	Unknown	Unaisi Biu Miqawalu (Levuka, Lakeba) [de facto]
Ratu Tevita Vakacereivalu Uluilakeba	July 26, 1927	March 25, 1998	Mere Waqa (of Levuka, Lakeba) [de facto]
Adi Atelaite Eci Uluilakeba	February 25, 1930	October 2007	Roko Oseni Senivaivai (of Tokatoka Naivi) [married]
Adi Neomai Vititoga Uluilakeba	1931	30 August 2015	Mere Waqa (of Levuka, Lakeba) [de facto]
Ratu Viliame Vueta'asau Uluilakeba	October 30, 1933	March, 2012	Lakalaka (of Taqalevu) [de facto]
Ratu George Laifone Uluilakeba	January 4, 1935	1983	Adi Mereoni Veisa (of Tokatoka Vatuwaqa) [de facto]
Ratu Etuate Wainiu Uluilakeba	November 12, 1937	2011	Roko Oseni Senivaivai (of Tokatoka Naivi) [de facto]
Adi Taraivini Lubatilakeba Uluilakeba	October 10, 1938	June, 2017	Silipa Raikoro (Lemaki of Tubou) [de facto]
Adi Arieta Koila Uluilakeba	October 15, 1939	October 24, 2009	Lakalaka (of Taqalevu) [de facto]
Adi Keresi Sekasekanimunia Uluilakeba	June 19, 1942	Still alive	Adi Mereseini Radinivuna (of Tokatoka Vatuwaqa) [de facto]
Adi Asilina Davila Uluilakeba	July 19, 1943	Still alive	Silipa Raikoro (Lemaki of Tubou) [de facto]
Adi Sainimili Rokolewasau Uluilakeba	January 28, 1946	November 9, 2012	Silipa Raikoro (Lemaki of Tubou) [de facto]
Adi Lola Po'fa Uluilakeba	August 22, 1947	Still alive	Eseta Waji (of Oneata, Lau) [de facto]
Adi Asenaca Saurogo Lalakoverata Uluilakeba	February 20, 1948	February 20, 2009	Lakalaka (of Taqalevu) [de facto]
Ratu Sitiveni Blue Tikoivavalagi Uluilakeba	Unknown	Unknown	Leba Kiji(of Katubalevu) [de facto]
