= Epeli Qaraninamu Nailatikau =

Fijian politician (born 1942)

Ratu Dr. Epeli Qaraninamu Nailatikau (born 1942) is a Fiji a medical doctor and former political leader, who served in the Senate from 2004 to 2006. He was nominated on 24 September 2004 by the Fiji Labour Party, to fill a vacancy caused by the death of former Senator Joeli Kalou. Under the Constitution of Fiji, the Leader of the Opposition nominates 8 of the 32 Senators. The eight nominees of the Leader of the Opposition were required to reflect the political composition of the House of Representatives. As the Labour Party was the principal opposition, it got to choose most or all of the eight opposition Senators.

== Medical career ==
Nailatikau had wide experience locally and internationally as a medical doctor. Once the chief medical officer to the United Nations Interim Force in Lebanon, he later played an important role after the Fiji coup of 2000, as head of the trauma team providing counseling for the parliamentarians (and their families) who had been kidnapped and held hostage in the insurrection. He also established his own medical clinic, the Siloah People's Clinic, in Tavua.

== Views on the chiefly system, religion ==
Nailatikau spoke out in early March 2006 against what he said was the failure of chiefs to set examples of good leadership, transparency, and vision for the following generations. "We must be role models and practice what we say. Right now there is a lack of authority at the village level," he said. Instead of leading the people, some chiefs were using their positions for personal enrichment, he alleged at the Peace and Stability Development Analysis Awareness Forum, which was organized by the United Nations Development Program. He declared that traditional influence in a modern government was out of place. On a separate issue, he said that traditional objections to interracial marriages were an obstacle to peace and stability in Fiji.

Nailatikau continued his attack on the chiefly system with a Parliamentary speech on 10 March. Fijian culture and traditions needed to be brought up to date with the modern world, he said, and chiefs should be chosen democratically and for fixed terms, the Fiji Times quoted him as saying. According to the Fiji Sun, he also called for politics and religion to be clearly separated, though with the latter morally underpinning the former.

== Personal life ==
Nailatikau is married to Latu, a schoolteacher.
