= Joni Madraiwiwi I =

Fijian chief (1859–1920)

Joni Madraiwiwi
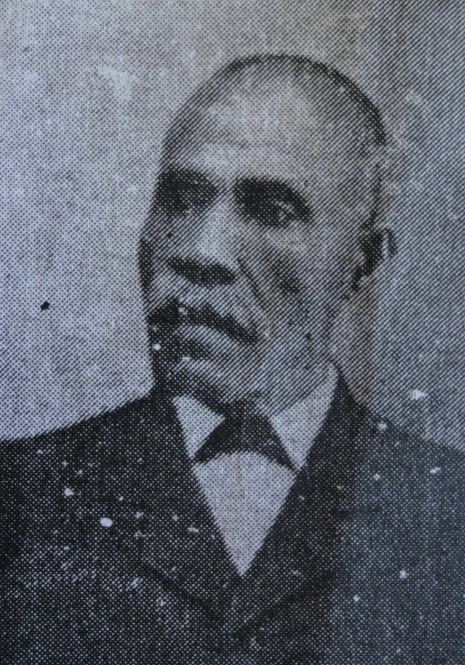
- Madraiwiwi, probably while he was Roko Tui Ra

Appointed Member of the Legislative Council

Roko Tui of Ra Province
- In office 1896–

Roko Tui of Bua Province
- In office 1904–

Roko Tui of Tailevu Province
- In office 1912–1920
- Preceded by: Penaia Kadavulevu
- Succeeded by: Popi Seniloli

Personal details
- Born: 1859 Suva, Fiji
- Died: December 1920 (aged 60–61)

Ratu Joni Madraiwiwi (1859 – December 1920) was a Fijian Ratu and early colonial administrator in what was then the British Crown Colony of Fiji.

== Heritage ==
Born in Bau, Madraiwiwi was the son of Bauan chief and rebel Ratu Mara Kapaiwai, who had been executed by his cousin Seru Epenisa Cakobau on 6 August 1859, shortly after Madraiwiwi's birth. His mother, Adi Loaloakubou was half-sister of Ratu Cakobau the Vunivalu of Bau and later King of Fiji. Her marriage to Mara Kapaiwai came after she had been promised first to the Tui Nakelo in return for support against one of many campaigns between Bau and Rewa; this promise was reneged upon, and she was given to Ratu Gavidi, Komai Nadrukuta. She was widowed on 26 April 1850 when Gavidi was shot in the back during a skirmish with the rival vanua of Verata. Prior to his execution, Mara Kapaiwai named his son Madraiwiwi, meaning "sour bread".

Madraiwiwi was raised in Cakobau's household. He was educated in Navuloa by Methodist missionaries before entering the civil service as an audit clerk. In 1887 Madraiwiwi married Adi Litiana Maopa, a granddaughter of Cakobau. They had six children; Lala Sukuna (later one of the main leaders of Fiji), Asenaca Teimumu Vuikaba, Tiale Vuiyasawa, Kacaraini Loaloakubou, J.A.R. Dovi (Fiji's first qualified doctor) and Timoci Tavanavanua.

Madraiwiwi progressed rapidly through the civil service and was appointed to the Legislative Council. In 1896 he became the Roko Tui of Ra Province, the highest position open to Fijians. He also began serving as Roko Tui of Bua Province in 1904, before being appointed Roko Tui of Tailevu Province in 1912.
