= Bau (island) =

Small island in Fiji off the east coast of Viti Levu

- Island
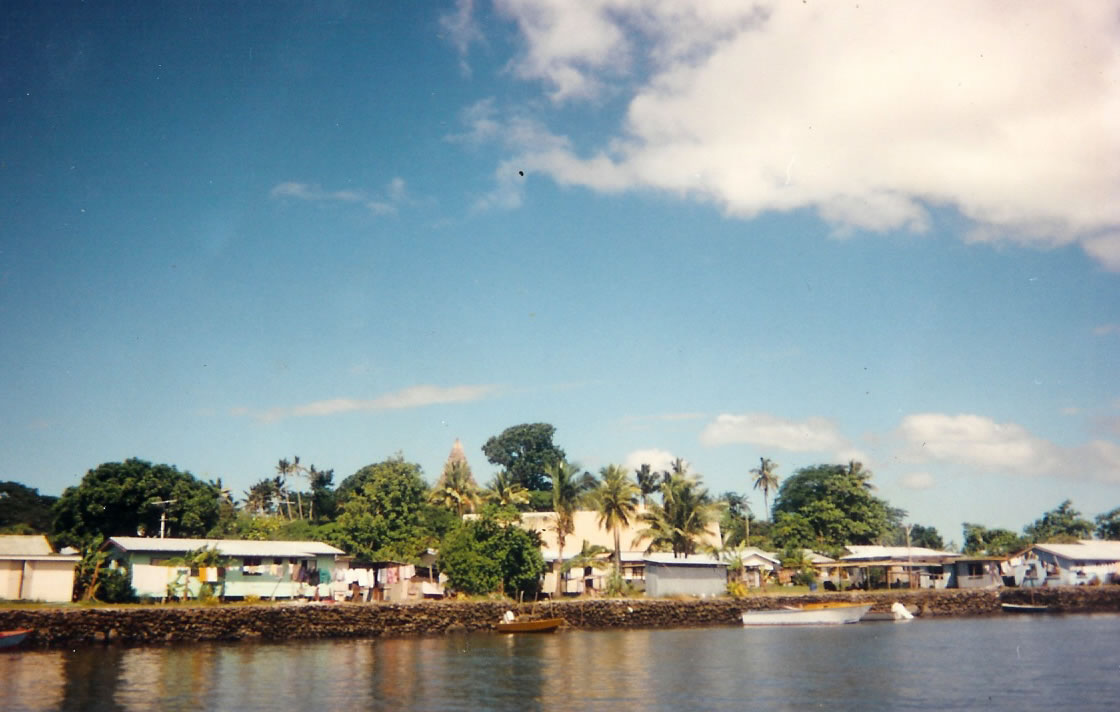
- Bau Island. In the centre is the roof of the assembly hall of the Council of Chiefs of the Kubuna Confederacy

- Location in Fiji
- Country: Fiji
- Island group: Viti Levu Group
- Division: Central Division
- Province: Tailevu
- District: Bau

Bau (pronounced [ᵐbɔu̯]) is a small island in Fiji, off the east coast of the main island of Viti Levu. Bau rose to prominence in the mid-1800s and became Fiji's dominant power; until its cession to Britain, it has maintained its influence in politics and leadership right through to modern Fiji. Due to its sacred nature, foreigners have to apply for a permit to visit.

== Territories and landmarks ==
Bau is the capital of the Kubuna Confederacy (Kubuna Tribe) and the chiefly centre of Tailevu Province. It is divided into three villages: Bau, Lasakau and Soso.

- Vatanitawake temple is the spirithouse (bure kalou) of the chiefs and a historic community hall
- the Rara is a community green in front of the temple and the Ulu ni Vuaka assembly house
- Methodist Church, built from the remains of the other 25 bure kalou. It is Fiji's oldest Christian church. The stone at the altar was originally a killing stone (Vatunibokola) on which the skulls of cannibalism victims were crushed
- Sau Tabu mausoleum of Ratu Seru Cakobau and his descendants
- Delalasakau, assembly hall of the Great Council of Chiefs constructed in 1982 for Queen Elizabeth II visit
- Soso, natural water spring

== Chiefly titles ==
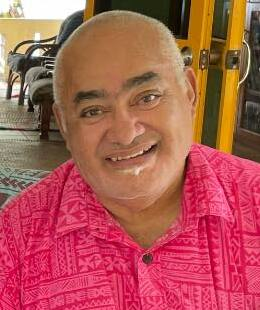
Ratu Epenisa Cakobau, 13th Vunivalu of Bau since 2023

Significant chiefly titles from Bau include the Vunivalu, who is considered to be Fiji's premier chiefly title, and the Roko Tui Bau. The 13th Vunivalu is Ratu Epenisa Cakobau since 2023, and the Roko Tui Bau is currently held by Ratu Joni Madraiwiwi, the former Vice-President of Fiji.

The village of Lasakau who are inhabited by the clan Nabou, referred to as Na Bai kei Bau, is ruled by the Komai Nadrukuta.

The village of Soso is occupied by the clan Rara, often referred to as the Rara o Soso and is headed by the Tunidau.

== Language ==
The Fijian language has many dialects, but the official standard is based on the speech of Bau.

== History ==
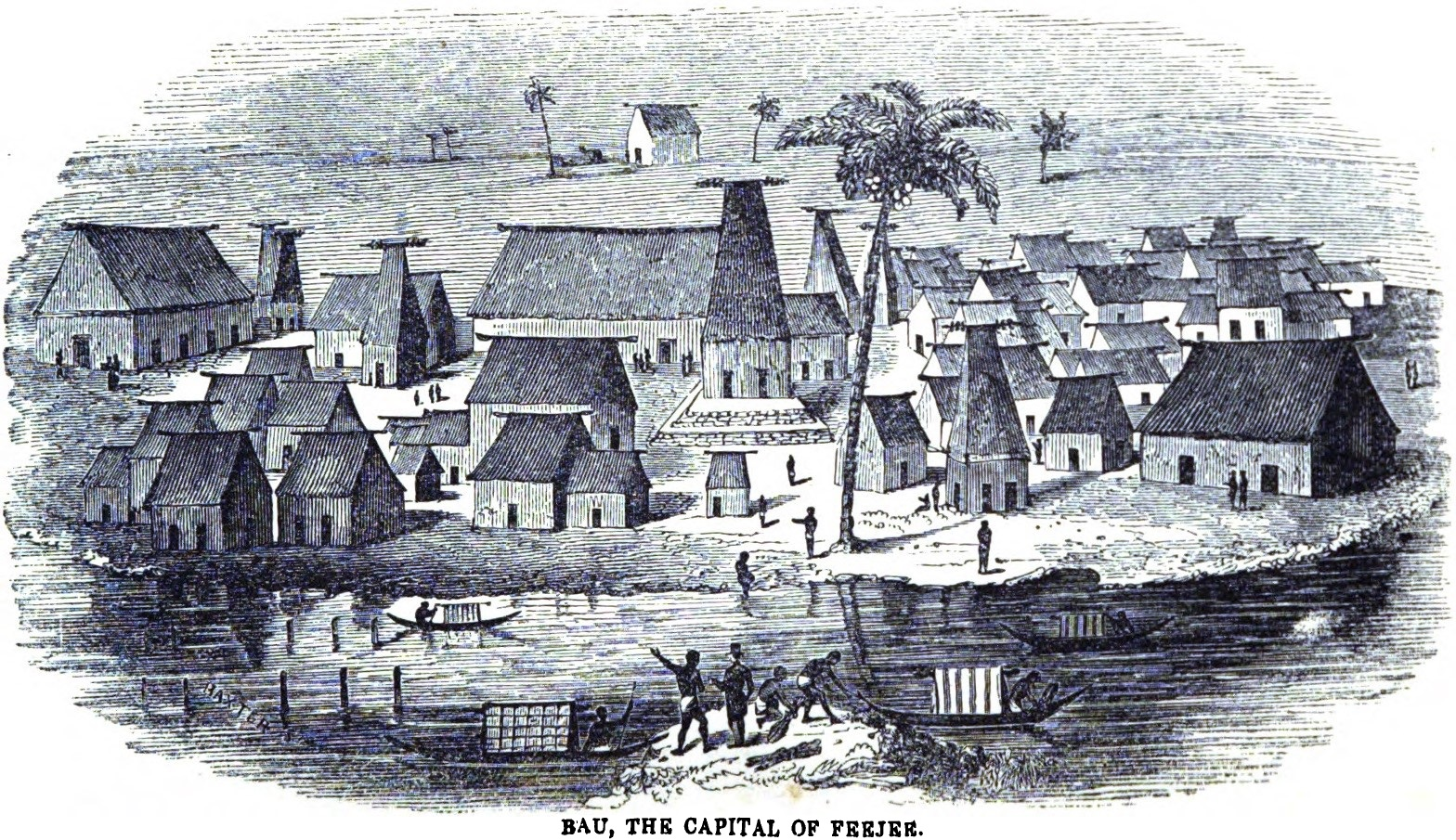
Etching with a view of Bau, the capital of Feejee (1848)

It was at Kubuna that the great ancestral chief, Ratu Vueti Koroi-Ratu mai Bulu, Serui-Ratu mai Bulu, the first Roko Tui Bau Vuani-ivi (according to the legend he was the fourth generation from Ratu Lutunasobasoba) established the Kingdom of Kubuna and formed one of the earliest known Fijian settlements after hostilities ceased the people of Nakauvadra and the victorious Bauan army upon leaving the mountains and finding their way to the sea made a Cairn named Ulunivuaka and later called it Bau in honour of Ratu Vueti and his achievements. It was named after a shrine in the Nakauvadra range. He took the titles of Roko Tui Bau Vuani-ivi and Koroi Ratu Maibulu. After his death, he was buried in Kubuna.

After his death, a division arose between Bucaira and Vunibuca over the installation of a successor to Ratu Vueti. Other clans went to Namuka and wandered from place to place. Eventually, a new Roko Tui Bau, Ratu Serumataidrau, was selected from the Vuaniivi, a Tokatoka Valelevu of the Mataqali and the Yavusa Ratu Vuani-ivi Buca clan, which had settled at Namuka.

Naulivou was installed in 1791 as the Vunivalu (in modern Fiji this is now the highest chiefly title in the Kingdom of Kubuna, but was not so in Fiji's early history) after the death of his father Banuve who had three sons: Naulivou, Tanoa II and Celua in 1791. Ratu Raiwalui of the Roko Tui Bau Vuaniivi Clan, Yavusa-Ratu, became the sixth Roko Tui Bau Vuani-Ivi which was the highest chiefly title in the greater area of Kubuna and the second Roko Tui Bau Vuani-Ivi that occupied the Island Delainakorolevu or Ulunivuaka, which was then called Bau in 1760 which was named by the fifth Roko Tui Bau Vuani-ivi Ratu Lele who was then buried at Delai Daku.

The relationship between these two men was not a happy one. When they came into conflict, the Vuaniivi clan fled to Kubuna and sought the protection of Titokobitu, the Chief of Namara. Together with some other chiefs of Namara, they reached Koro and from there went to Vuna, on the island of Taveuni, and thence to Vanuabalavu. The Namara people who later joined their early travellers now of Levukana village on Lomaloma were left behind at Vuna and they fled to the mountains lest the Bauans should pursue them. The Vuaniivi warriors left some of their war canoes high and dry on the beach at Vuna when they set off for Vanuabalavu.

With the aid of Charlie Savage, who brought firearms to Bau, opportunities for new wealth and power, symbolized by the acquisition of muskets, intensified political rivalries and hastened the rise of the Kingdom of Bau, ruled by Naulivou as Vunivalu and then by his nephew Cakobau. By the 1850s Bau dominated western Fiji. Cakobau's main rival was the Tongan chief Enele Ma'afu, who led an army of Christian Tongans and their allies from eastern Fiji. After a short-lived alliance with Ma’afu, Cakobau became a Christian in 1854. The Bauan people quickly established themselves as an undefeatable military force. With that unmatched power, Seru Epenisa Cakobau was able to unite all of Fiji's disparate tribes under his authority in 1871.

The reconstitution ceremony of the Great Council of Chiefs took place there on May 24, 2023. National champion Ratu Banuve Tabakaucoro received the honour in welcoming the state president and prime minister with the ceremonial offering of kava.

== See also ==
- Lasakau sea warriors
- List of islands
- Vatanitawake
