= Moala =

Moala may refer to:

- Moala (beetle), a genus of beetles in the family Cerambycidae
- Moala Airport, an airport serving Moala, the main island of the Moala Islands
- Moala Island, a volcanic island in the Moala subgroup
- Moala Islands, a subgroup of Fiji's Lau archipelago

== People with the surname ==
- Fili Moala (born 1985), American football player
- Indira Moala, a participant in New Zealand Idol
- Paul Moala (born 2000), American football player
- Tara Moala, New Zealand community development worker
