= 2012–13 Southern Hemisphere tropical cyclone season =

The 2012–13 Southern Hemisphere tropical cyclone season may refer to one of three different basins and respective seasons:

- 2012–13 South-West Indian Ocean cyclone season, west of 90°E
- 2012–13 Australian region cyclone season, between 90°E and 160°E
- 2012–13 South Pacific cyclone season, east of 160°E
