= Josefa Namosimalua =

Fijian rugby union player

- Born: 7 July 2003 (age 23) Naroi, Fiji
- Height: 193 cm (6 ft 4 in)
- Weight: 114 kg (251 lb; 17 st 13 lb)
- School: Whanganui Collegiate School

Rugby union career
- Position: Flanker
- Current team: Drua / Taranaki
Senior career
Years	Team	Apps	(Points)
2026–	Taranaki	9	(5)
2027–	Drua	0	(0)
- Correct as of 2 November 2026

Josefa Namosimalua (born 7 July 2003) is a Fijian rugby union player, who plays for the Drua. His preferred position is flanker.

== Early career ==
Namosimalua is from Naroi, but moved to New Zealand as a child, attending Whanganui Collegiate School. After leaving school, he remained in New Zealand playing club rugby for the Border side in Whanganui before transferring to Ingelwood in Taranaki province.

== Professional career ==
Namosimalua was named in the Taranaki side for the 2026 Hilux NPC. His performances over the season earned him Taranaki's most promising player award. In October 2026, he was announced as signing for the Drua, before later being named in their squad for the 2027 Super Rugby Pacific season.
