= Anthony Gates =

Australian judge

The Honourable Anthony Gates CF
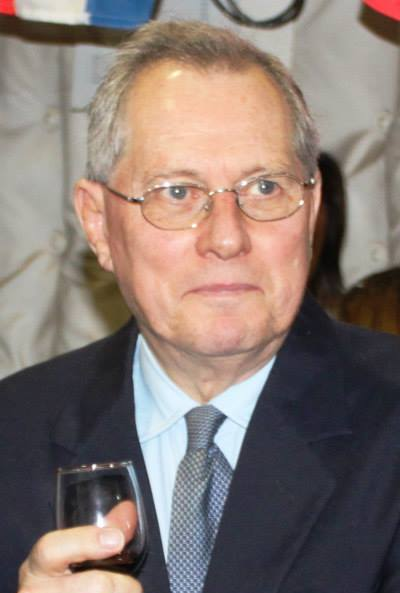
- Gates in 2015

Chief Justice of Fiji
- In office 18 December 2008 – 7 April 2019; Acting: 3 January 2007 – 18 December 2008
- President: Josefa Iloilo; Epeli Nailatikau; George Konrote
- Preceded by: Daniel Fatiaki
- Succeeded by: Kamal Kumar

Personal details
- Born: United Kingdom
- Education: Cambridge University

Anthony Harold Cumberland Thomas Gates CF was the chief justice of Fiji from 2008 to 2019.

Gates is best known for his decision in Chandrika Prasad v. Att-Gen of Fiji [2000] 2 FLR 89; Prasad v. Republic of Fiji & Another [2001] 1 LRC 665; [2001] NZAR 21 in which he held that the Constitution of Fiji had not been abrogated by the military intervention in 2000, and that the Constitution continued to be the law of the land. His decision was upheld by Fiji’s Court of Appeal, in February 2001. However, the decision which should have led to the restoration of the Parliament suspended by the coup of 2000 was not obeyed by the government at that time, the Government instead choosing to call for a vote in 2001.

Gates is also well known for his decisions that enforced civil rights for prison inmates (Noa Yasa & Anor v State HAM063A.05S [2005] paclii) and for the treason-related hearings of people alleged to have been involved in the political events in Fiji of 2000.

== Early life ==
Gates was born in the United Kingdom and is a graduate of Cambridge University. He went to Sierra Leone as a volunteer teacher with VSO (Voluntary Service Overseas) as well as Sri Lanka where he taught English at Royal College Colombo, and to this day he retains a house in Sri Lanka. After qualifying as a barrister at Inner Temple London he practiced law in London. He took an appointment at the office of the Director of Public Prosecutions, Fiji in 1977. He became the Deputy Director of Public Prosecutions in 1981 and a Magistrate in 1985. He was dismissed as a Magistrate in 1985 when he refused to renew his oath of allegiance to coup leader Colonel Sitiveni Rabuka, the new self-appointed Head of State. He left Fiji to work for the Commonwealth Director of Public Prosecutions in Brisbane, and returned to Fiji in November 1993 to work for Sidiq Koya. He was appointed to the High Court of Fiji in 1999.

== Recent career ==
On 17 January 2007, 14 days after the removal of the Chief Justice by the military during the 2006 Fijian coup d'état, the President of Fiji, Ratu Josefa Iloilo appointed Justice Gates Acting Chief Justice. The substantive Chief Justice Daniel Fatiaki, had asked the then president of the Court of Appeal Justice Gordon Ward, to "hold the fort" for the judiciary as a de facto Acting Chief Justice. Chief Justice Fatiaki made public statements attacking Justice Gates for taking the position.

As a result of the appointment, the Judiciary became divided between those judges of the High Court, Court of Appeal and Supreme Court who supported Ward and judges and magistrates who supported the appointment of Gates as Chief Justice. The Court of Appeal judges who continued to sit heard a number of appeals against Chief Justice Gates' decisions, and in almost all cases overruled him. The Court of Appeal even ordered Chief Justice to give oral evidence at the appeal hearing in Ratu Takiveikata's matter. This was an order which was unprecedented in Fiji's history. Takiveikata was charged with inciting a mutiny at the Queen Elizabeth Barracks intended to remove Commodore Bainimarama as the Commander of the Fiji military. The attempt failed because the majority of soldiers remained loyal to the Commodore. However, after Takiveikata was convicted by Justice Gates two business associates who were his neighbors and friends provided affidavits in the Court of appeal. They alleged that Justice Gates had told them at a party for Bastille Day that he would imprison the accused after the trial. Later the Court of Appeal held that a doubt had been created by the evidence of the defendant's friends and neighbors and quashed the convictions. A retrial was ordered. In the judgment the Court of Appeal failed to consider if the trial had been fairly conducted by Chief Justice Gates, a consideration which is ordinarily mandatory in cases where judicial bias is raised. On retrial Ratu Takiveikata was convicted by the High Court and sentenced to life imprisonment.

The Court of Appeal quashed all Gates's decisions and none of the Court of Appeal Judges sought reappointment under his leadership. In September 2007 six judges from the Fiji Court of Appeal who were from New Zealand and Australia resigned. Recommendations for new appointments to the Bench were made by the Judicial Services Commission to the President. These new appointments upheld the claim of the deposed prime minister of Fiji Mr Laisenia Qarase that the 2006 Military takeover was illegal and had no validity. In doing so they overruled the High Court under Chief Justice Gates. Although this decision has been criticised for lack of internal consistency in that the Court of Appeal failed to order the reinstatement of the Qarase government instead ordered the appointment of an interim government and this decision confirmed the independence of Fijian Judiciary after 2006.

In 2009 after the decision of the Court of Appeal, the 1997 Constitution was purportedly abrogated by the president of Fiji, Ratu Josefa Iloilo, and all judicial appointments were terminated. The chief justice was re-appointed after a lapse of two months and has reformed the Judiciary - mainly with appointments from Sri Lanka, although some judges and magistrates were Fijian, or from New Zealand, Hong Kong, or Australia.

Resident Judge of Court of Appeal Justice William Marshall alleged in his petition that Gates had been briefing Fiji's prime minister Frank Bainimarama and this prompted the expulsion of envoys from Australia and New Zealand from Fiji. Gates acted as temporary president of Fiji between late September and early October 2010 during the absence of Ratu Epeli Nailatikau. In December 2010 the United States Embassy, who remained critical of Gates appointment as Chief Justice, denied to issue Gates a visa to represent Fiji at an International Criminal Court convention.

A 2012 analysis of Fiji judicial matters presented in the form of a Petition by Justice William Marshall, Resident Justice of Appeal in Fiji considered that Gates was the subject of an unjust ruling in the Takiveikata case as a result of political interference but that he himself had become an agent of the Attorney General in the Interim Government.

Marshal, who wrote a lengthy Petition to the Prime Minister saying the judiciary is not independent, offered his own services as political adviser to the Prime Minister.

The Marshall petition has been strongly criticized by the President of Fiji's Court of Appeal in a judgment on contempt of court in AG vs Tai Nicholas where the judge said that William Marshall was happy enough with the independence of the judiciary until his contract was not renewed.

The Fijian judiciary continues to function under the leadership of Gates with an emphasis on open justice, compulsory judicial training and case management. There are still delays in the court system in the civil jurisdiction, but criminal cases can now be heard within one year of the initial charges.

Justice Gates came out very strongly accusing Australia and New Zealand of interfering in the Fijian judiciary. Gates accused both countries of counseling the Sri Lankan Judges against working in Fiji.

During the ground-breaking ceremony for a $35million High Court complex in Lautoka on 12 September 2014, Gates said the users of the existing High Court building in Lautoka knew the facility was inadequate for the amount of business conducted at the premises. Chief Justice Gates believes that if the Western Division is to develop economically, financially and in its institutions and services, the justice system within the division must be able to respond to society's needs.

Chief Justice Anthony Gates was part of the Fiji delegation to speak at UPR in Geneva. Chief Justice spoke about the barriers experienced by the Judiciary in its functioning after the events of 2009. He once again highlighted the effects of the travel ban imposed on judges.
