= Timoci Tuivaga =

Fijian judge

The Honourable Sir Timoci Tuivaga CF

20th Chief Justice of Fiji
- In office 1980 – 31 July 2002
- Monarchs: Elizabeth II; To 1987
- President: Ratu Sir Penaia Ganilau; Ratu Sir Kamisese Mara; Ratu Josefa Iloilo
- Preceded by: Sir Clifford Grant
- Succeeded by: Daniel Fatiaki

Personal details
- Born: 21 October 1931 Matuku Island, Lau Province, Colony of Fiji
- Died: 30 December 2015 (aged 84) Suva Golf Club, Suva, Fiji
- Spouse(s): Viliamina Leba Parrott Savu; 20 December 1958 – 13 January 2000 (her death); Raijeli Vasakula m. July 2002
- Children: 5

Sir Timoci Uluiburotu Tuivaga (21 October 1931 – 30 December 2015) was a Fijian judge, who was Chief Justice from 31 March 1980 to 31 July 2002, when he retired. He was Fiji's first native-born Chief Justice.

== Education and career ==
Tuivaga was educated at the University of Auckland in New Zealand where he graduated with a Bachelor of Arts on a Lau Provincial Council Scholarship. He was further educated in Middle Temple in London, where he read Law. He was admitted to the bar in 1964 and served as a Native Magistrate from 1958 to 1961. He was appointed as Crown Counsel in 1965, becoming their principal legal officer in 1968. He held this office till 1970. In 1972, he was appointed to the bench as a Puisne judge. When the Chief Justice, Sir Clifford Grant, resigned in 1980 under pressure from Fiji's first Prime Minister, Ratu Sir Kamisese Mara, Tuivaga was appointed Chief Justice by the Governor-General of Fiji, Ratu Sir George Cakobau.

== Knighthood ==
Tuivaga was awarded a knighthood in the 1980 Birthday Honours List for his achievement as the first native Chief Justice of Fiji. He travelled to London to receive the knighthood at Buckingham Palace.

== Coup controversies ==
Tuivaga upheld the independence of the judiciary in the wake of the two military coups that rocked Fiji in 1987. His actions in a later coup in 2000, however, generated much controversy. Together with two other judges, Michael Scott and Daniel Fatiaki (who later succeeded him as Chief Justice), Tuivaga advised the then-President, Ratu Sir Kamisese Mara, to abrogate the Constitution, as requested by the Military. Mara refused and resigned on 29 May. An Interim Military Government, headed by Commodore Frank Bainimarama took power, abrogated the Constitution, and promulgated the Administration of Justice Decree, which Tuivaga had drafted. This decree abolished the Supreme Court, made the Chief Justice the President of the Appeal Court (of which, according to the constitution, he had previously been barred from membership). Another decree extended the retirement age of the Chief Justice from 70 years to 75. Fiji Law Society President Peter Knight condemned Tuivaga's actions, saying, "The eyes of the profession, the nation and the world are upon the judiciary. It cannot be seen to openly condone criminal activity. It should as a matter of record that it will continue to occupy and function in its judicial role in the same uncompromising manner as it had done prior to 19 May." (These changes to the judiciary were subsequently reversed by a High Court decision to reinstate the Constitution on 15 November 2000. This decision was upheld by the Appeal Court on 1 March 2001).

Tuivaga was subsequently sued by members of the deposed government of Prime Minister Mahendra Chaudhry for his role in abrogating the constitution, which all judges were bound by oath to uphold.

In an interview with the Daily Post on 15 June 2000, Tuivaga defended his role, saying it was not an endorsement but a practical acknowledgement of "reality". "While a de facto government is in place it is impossible for me as Chief Justice not to acknowledge its actual existence as a matter of political reality," he said. The Interim Military Government, which he called "the only viable alternative government", needed to be recognized, he said, given the "situation triggered by the state of insurrection in the country which so far has proved insidiously intractable".

These changes to the judiciary authorised by the decrees that Tuivaga had drafted were subsequently reversed by a High Court decision to reinstate the Constitution on 15 November 2000. This decision was upheld by the Appeal Court on 1 March 2001. That year, he turned 70, the retirement age mandated by the restored Constitution. On 1 August 2002, Daniel Fatiaki succeeded him as Chief Justice.

== Failed ICC candidacy ==
Following his retirement as Chief Justice, the Fijian government nominated Tuivaga as Fiji's candidate for a position on the new International Criminal Court (ICC). His role in the 2000 coup came back to haunt him, and the Fiji Law Society strongly criticised his nomination. In what the Fijian government saw as a humiliation, he was forced to withdraw his nomination during the balloting on 9 February 2003, when the Samoan candidate Tuiloma Neroni Slade outpolled him.

== Reconciliation and Unity Commission ==
In May 2005, Tuivaga spoke in favour of the government's proposed Reconciliation and Unity Commission, which would, if established, have the power to compensate victims of offenses related to the 2000 coup, and amnesty to its perpetrators, subject to presidential approval. Tuivaga cautioned, however, that the workability of the arrangement would depend on the good will of the parties involved.

On 26 May 2005, the Rev. Akuila Yabaki of the Citizens Constitutional Forum expressed concern at reports that Tuivaga might be appointed to chair the proposed commission, reports downplayed by both Prime Minister Laisenia Qarase and Opposition Leader Mahendra Chaudhry.

== Under investigation ==
In the wake of the military coup which deposed the Qarase government on 5 December 2006, Interim Attorney-General Aiyaz Sayed-Khaiyum announced on 22 January 2007 that there would be an inquiry into allegations concerning the role of the judiciary in the events of 2000. It was reported that Tuivaga might be subject to the inquiry. In a letter to the Fiji Sun on 23 January, Tuivaga expressed surprise, saying that the Constitution of Fiji made no provision for investigating retired members of the judiciary.

== Memoir ==
In October 2014, Tuivaga released his memoirs titled, A Memoir of Sir Timoci Tuivaga Kt. CF..

== Personal life ==
Tuivaga, who came from the village of Yaroi on Matuku Island, in the Lau archipelago, was the son of Isimeili Siga Tuivaga and Jessie Hill. On 20 December 1958, he married Dr. Viliamina Leba Parrott Savu at the Centenary Methodist Church in Suva. In 1992, she suffered a cerebral stroke. She died on 13 January 2000. In July 2002, Tuivaga married Raijeli Vasakula, a lawyer and the eldest daughter of the former deputy prime minister and academic, Tupeni Baba, and Adi Miriama Cagilaba. They resided in Muanikau and she continues to run her own law practice. Tuivaga had five children (William, Jessie, John and Timothy) and eleven grandchildren. In a traditional reunification Fijian ceremony in 2013, Tuivaga and his clan welcomed and acknowledged Captain Koresi Toaisi Tuivaga, of Maqbool Road, Nadera, as the eldest of the Tuivaga children.

== Death ==
Tuivaga had gone out to play nine holes at the Suva Golf Club on Wednesday, 30 December 2015. Afterwards he came into the club house for drinks with friends and collapsed. Efforts by Army Commander Viliame Naupoto were unsuccessful and he died at 84 years old.

Preceded by Sir Clifford Grant	Chief Justice of Fiji; 1974–2002	Succeeded by Daniel Fatiaki
