= Daniel Fatiaki =

Fijian judge

The Honourable Daniel Fatiaki CF

Chief Justice of Nauru
- In office 29 January 2021 – January 2026
- Preceded by: Filimone Jitoko
- Succeeded by: Janmai Jay Udit

21st Chief Justice of Fiji
- In office 1 August 2002 – 3 January 2007 (de facto); 5 December 2008 (de jure)
- Preceded by: Sir Timoci Tuivaga
- Succeeded by: Anthony Gates

Personal details
- Born: Taniela Vafo'ou Fatiaki; 1954 (age 71–72) Motusa, Rotuma, Colony of Fiji, British Empire
- Spouse: Martha Fatiaki
- Children: 4 sons
- Education: University of the South Pacific; University of Auckland

Taniela (Daniel) Vafo'ou Fatiaki CF (born 1954) was the Chief Justice of Fiji from 1 August 2002, when he succeeded Sir Timoci Tuivaga, till 5 December 2008. As Chief Justice, he presided over both the High Court and the Supreme Court, but was constitutionally barred from presiding over, or even sitting on, the Appeal Court. On 3 January 2007, he was sent on leave by the Republic of Fiji Military Forces, which had seized power on 5 December 2006. On 19 January, he was formally suspended, pending an investigation into allegations of misconduct. This investigation was dropped in December 2008 as part of a deal that involved his formal resignation.

== Early life and career ==
Fatiaki was born in Upu village in the district of Motusa, on the island of Rotuma, which enjoys a considerable degree of internal autonomy from Fiji. He moved with his family to Suva, the Fijian capital, for schooling. After attending Marist Brothers Primary School, he went on to study at Marist Brothers High School from 1967 to 1970. He enrolled in the Foundation Programme at the University of the South Pacific for one year, and won the Morris Hedstrom scholarship to study Law at the University of Auckland in New Zealand, from which he graduated in 1976.

Fatiaki practiced Law in New Zealand from 1977 to 1979, and in Fiji from 1979 to 1984. He was then appointed to the post of Commissioner for Oaths in Fiji. He later served as Fatiaki was previously Chairman of the Fiji Law Reform Commission in 1994 and 1995. Fatiaki has served as a judge on the Supreme Court of Vanuatu. He has been the Chief Justice of Nauru since 29 January 2021.

== Controversial appointment ==
Fatiaki's appointment was not without controversy. Then Opposition leader Prem Singh objected on the grounds that in the midst of the Fiji coup of 2000, Fatiaki had joined Tuivaga and Justice Michael Scott in advising the then President, Ratu Sir Kamisese Mara, to abrogate the constitution, in accordance with the wishes of the Military. Mara refused, and resigned. The three Justices subsequently recognised the Interim Military Government of Commodore Frank Bainimarama, and drafted decrees abrogating the constitution, abolishing the Supreme Court, making the Chief Justice the President of the Appeal Court, and raising the retirement age of the Chief Justice from 70 years to 75. (These changes were later reversed after a High Court decision reinstating the constitution on 15 November 2000 was upheld by the Appeal Court on 1 March 2001. Rev. Akuila Yabaki of the Citizens Constitutional Forum, a human rights group, said that Fatiaki's participation in such anticonstitutional actions should disqualify him from holding the office of Chief Justice, and suggested that as the judiciary had been thoroughly compromised politically, it would be best for the time being to appoint a Chief Justice from outside of Fiji (the constitution allows members of the judiciary, unlike other government officials, to be non-citizens, and it is not unusual for retired judges from other Commonwealth countries to be appointed to the bench). Prime Minister Laisenia Qarase disagreed, however, and President Ratu Josefa Iloilo (who had taken office on 13 July 2000) appointed Fatiaki on his advice, saying he was confident that Fatiaki would maintain the same standards of integrity that Tuivaga had upheld.

== The 2006 coup ==
=== Forced leave ===
In the wake of the military coup that deposed the Qarase government on 5 December 2006, Commodore Josaia Voreqe (Frank) Bainimarama, the Commander of the Republic of Fiji Military Forces and Acting President of Fiji, sent Fatiaki on leave. He told the Fiji Times on 7 January that he had been told to go on leave or be dismissed. Earlier, Fatiaki had said just before the coup that the judiciary would uphold the Fijian constitution and would go down with it if it were abrogated, the Fiji Times quoted him on 5 December (the day of the coup) as having told a conference at the Shangri-La's Fijian Resort in Yanuca, Sigatoka that weekend.

=== Criticism of Acting Chief Justice ===
Fatiaki condemned as a "disgrace" the appointment of Anthony Gates as Acting Chief Justice on 16 January, saying it was unconstitutional and compromised the integrity and independence of the judiciary. He criticised fellow-Judge Nazhat Shameem for her role in the decision, saying that she had unlawfully chaired a meeting of the Judicial Service Commission (JSC) and written to President Ratu Josefa Iloilo on behalf of the JSC, identifying herself as Chair of the JSC, which is in fact a role reserved for the Chief Justice, recommending the appointment of Gates. He condemned this as a disgrace and a betrayal of trust, and said, contrary to assertions from Shameem and interim Attorney-General Aiyaz Sayed-Khaiyum, that his leave of absence was forced, not voluntary. Attorney-General Khaiyum said that Shameem had chaired the meeting on his orders, not her own initiative.

=== Return to work ===
In an act of defiance towards his forced leave and the appointment of Justice Gates as Acting Chief Justice, on 18 January 2007 Justice Fatiaki returned to work at his office, saying in interviews:

"I have never ceased to be the Chief Justice of this nation. I have decided that the time is right for me to come back and I am no longer going to wait for people to recall me. People are telling me that I'm voluntarily on leave, well lets see...I voluntarily also return to the office.

At this point in time the acting Chief Justice ceases to function because I'm back in my office. The Chief Justice is back in his office and back heading the judiciary where he belongs.

I don't have guns, all I have is my conscience and power of the rule of law. If this government is true to its word and supports the independence of the judiciary then I have nothing to fear at all."

After this, a team of RFMF soldiers arrived at his office, asking him to leave the premises, followed by a visit to his chambers by the Senior Superintendent of Police, Jahir Khan along with Police's Elite Tactical Response Team officers. It is understood that Khan asked Justice Fatiaki to voluntarily vacate the chambers, and later escorted him to a police vehicle reportedly to drop him at his Suva residence. Interim Attorney-General Aiyaz Sayed-Khaiyum later accused him of having tried to illegally remove from his office documents that are subject to an investigation into his alleged role in the 2000 coup, claims that Fatiaki angrily denied. He could not have removed any documents, he said, as two military officers were with him the entire time.

=== Formally suspended ===
On 19 January 2007, it was revealed that President Ratu Josefa Iloilo had signed a decree formally suspending Fatiaki, pending an inquiry into allegations that he had been involved in the 2000 coup, to the extent of drafting decrees and giving legal advice to coup frontman George Speight.

Fiji Law Society President Devanesh Sharma condemned Fatiaki's suspension and threatened legal action.

On 22 January, it was announced that on 10 January, a directive from the Prime Minister's Office had banned Fatiaki from leaving Fiji. Parmesh Chand, the chief executive officer of the Prime Minister's Office, informed the Chief Registrar's Office that while Fatiaki was suspended, he would be banned from attending any meetings or conferences abroad. From 20 to 24 January, he had been scheduled to attend international meetings of jurists in Karachi, Pakistan, and in Perth, Australia.

Meanwhile, Fatiaki announced on 22 January that he was preparing to take legal action against his suspension.

== Resignation ==
Fatiaki formally resigned as Chief Justice on 5 December 2008. This came as a part of a deal with the interim government, under which he would receive a full pension and a F$275,000 payout, the state would discontinue its investigation into allegations of abuse of office and corruption while he was Chief Justice, and he in turn would drop (within seven days) all legal proceedings against the interim government. Both sides undertook not to pursue any future legal action against the other.

== Opinions ==
In an address to the convention of the Fiji Law Society at Warwick Hotel on the Coral Coast on 2 July 2005, Fatiaki called on the legal profession to uphold standards of integrity. It was important, he said, for the legal profession to be "independent of any centres of power, whether public or private, and of any cause." He maintained that the most valuable asset of any profession was its collective reputation.

== Personal life ==
Daniel Fatiaki is a Roman Catholic and a native of Rotuma, a Fijian Dependency. He is the first Rotuman to be appointed to the bench in Fiji, and his appointment as Chief Justice resulted in great public rejoicing on the island.

Fatiaki is the son of Anselmo Fatiaki, who was one of the first Rotumans to graduate from university. He has 5 brothers - Seforana, John, Alec, Joachim, and Christopher. He has one sister named Violet. He is married to Martha and has 4 sons. He was made a Companion of the Order of Fiji, together with Vijay Singh (the golfer), in 2004.

Preceded by Sir Timoci Tuivaga	Chief Justice of Fiji; 2002–2008	Succeeded by Anthony Gates (acting)
