= 2012–13 South Pacific cyclone season =

Tropical cyclone season

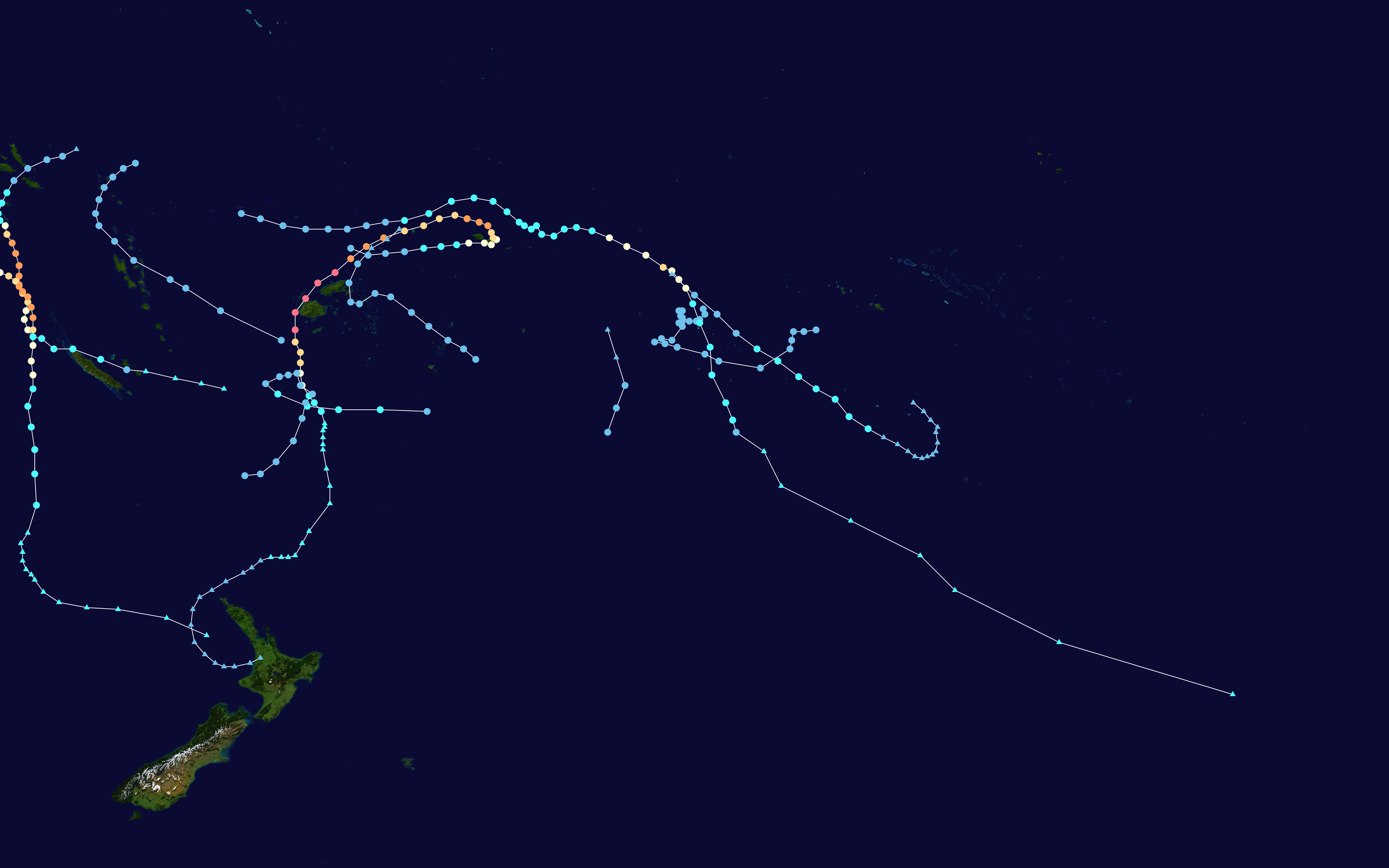
- Season summary map

Seasonal boundaries
- First system formed: November 6, 2012
- Last system dissipated: May 1, 2013

Strongest storm
- Name: Sandra
  - Maximum winds: 185 km/h (115 mph) (10-minute sustained)
  - Lowest pressure: 930 hPa (mbar)

Seasonal statistics
- Total disturbances: 22
- Total depressions: 11
- Tropical cyclones: 5
- Severe tropical cyclones: 4
- Total fatalities: 17 total
- Total damage: $312.8 million (2012 USD)

Related articles
- 2012–13 Australian region cyclone season; 2012–13 South-West Indian Ocean cyclone season

The 2012–13 South Pacific cyclone season was a below average tropical cyclone season, with five tropical cyclones occurring within the basin between 160°E and 120°W. The season officially ran from November 1, 2012, to April 30, 2013, however the last tropical disturbance was last noted on May 1, as it moved into the subtropics. During the season, tropical cyclones were officially monitored by the Fiji Meteorological Service (FMS), Australian Bureau of Meteorology (BoM) and New Zealand's MetService. The United States Joint Typhoon Warning Center (JTWC) and other national meteorological services including Météo-France and NOAA also monitored the basin during the season. During the season there were 22 significant tropical disturbances assigned a number and a F suffix by the FMS's Regional Specialized Meteorological Center in Nadi, Fiji (RSMC Nadi), including Severe Tropical Cyclone Sandra which moved into the basin from the Australian region on March 9. The BoM, MetService and RSMC Nadi all estimated sustained wind speeds over a period of 10-minutes and used the Australian tropical cyclone intensity scale, while the JTWC estimated sustained winds over a 1-minute period, which are subsequently compared to the Saffir–Simpson hurricane wind scale (SSHS).

== Seasonal forecasts ==
Source/Record	Tropical Cyclone	Severe Tropical Cyclone	Ref
Record high:	1997–98: 16	1982–83:10	
Record low:	2011–12: 3	2008–09: 0	
Averages:	7.9	3.5	
NIWA	9–12	4	
RSMC Nadi	7–10	4–6	
Region	Chance of above average	Average number	Actual activity
Southern Pacific	53%	15	7
Western South Pacific	35%	8	4
Eastern South Pacific	55%	11	3
Source:BOM's Seasonal Outlooks for Tropical Cyclones.

Ahead of the cyclone season, RSMC Nadi, TCWC Wellington, the Australian Bureau of Meteorology (BoM), the New Zealand National Institute of Water and Atmospheric Research (NIWA) and various other Pacific Meteorological services, all contributed towards the Island Climate Update tropical cyclone outlook that was released during October 2012. The outlook took into account the ENSO neutral conditions and near normal sea surface temperature anomalies that had been observed across the Pacific. As a result, the outlook called for a near average number of tropical cyclones for the 2012–13 season, with nine to twelve named tropical cyclones predicted to occur between 135°E and 120°W compared to an average of 10. At least two of the tropical cyclones were expected to become category 3 severe tropical cyclones, while one might intensify into a category 4 severe tropical cyclone. The outlook also noted within past analogues, category 5 severe tropical cyclones had not been prominent for ENSO neutral seasons, but the most recent analogue suggested that this type of event was possible.

In addition to contributing towards the outlook, RSMC Nadi and the BoM issued their own seasonal forecasts for the South Pacific region. The BoM issued 3 seasonal forecasts for the South Pacific region between 142.5°E and 120°W, one for the Western Southern Pacific region between 142.5°E and 165°E and one for the Eastern Southern Pacific region between 165°E and 120°W. They noted that the current neutral ENSO conditions would historically suggest the South Pacific region as a whole would experience near average tropical cyclone activity during the coming season. However, because of the warmer than average sea surface temperatures that were experienced in the central equatorial Pacific between July — September 2012, the western Southern Pacific had a 65% chance for average to below average tropical cyclone activity. For the Eastern part of the region, the BoM predicted that it had a 55% chance of above average tropical cyclones, while for the overall region, they predicted that the region would experience a near average amount of tropical cyclones with a 53% chance of having an above average number of tropical cyclones. Within their outlook RSMC Nadi predicted that between seven and ten tropical cyclones, would occur within the basin compared to an average of around 7.4 cyclones. At least four of the tropical cyclones were expected to become category 3 severe tropical cyclones, while 2–3 might intensify into a category 4 or 5 severe tropical cyclones. They also reported that the tropical cyclone genesis trough was expected to be located near the International Date Line. This was based on the ENSO Neutral conditions, and the existence of the warm pool of sea surface and sub surface temperature anomalies near the dateline.

=== Risk forecasts ===
Both the Island Climate Update and RSMC Nadi's tropical cyclone outlooks assessed the risk of a tropical cyclone affecting a certain island or territory. As the tropical cyclone genesis trough of low pressure was expected to be located near the Dateline, normal or above normal activity was expected for areas near the dateline. The Island Climate Update Outlook predicted that most of the countries to the west of the International Date Line, including Papua New Guinea, the Solomon Islands, Vanuatu, New Caledonia Tonga and Fiji were expected to experience near normal or slightly above normal activity. At least one or more severe tropical cyclones were expected to occur anywhere across the southwest Pacific during the season. RSMC Nadi's outlook predicted that New Caledonia, Southern Tonga, Tokelau, Tuvalu, Solomon Islands, Fiji and Vanuatu had an average risk of being affected by a tropical cyclone. Wallis and Futuna, Samoa, Northern Tonga, Niue, Cook Islands and French Polynesia were predicted to face an above average chance of being affected by a tropical cyclone. RSMC Nadi also predicted that there was a potential risk in the chances of severe tropical cyclones, affecting the region this year when compared to the previous season. There was a high chance of Tokelau being affected by a tropical cyclone while there was a moderate to high risk for severe tropical cyclones to affect New Caledonia, the Cook Islands, the Samoan Islands and the Solomon Islands. Wallis and Futuna, Tuvalu, Niue and Vanuatu were predicted to have a moderate risk while Fiji and Tonga were thought to have a low to moderate risk of being impacted by a severe tropical cyclone.

== Seasonal summary ==
The first tropical disturbance of the season developed on November 6, to the southwest of Suva, Fiji which moved towards the southeast over the next day before it was last noted during the next day as it moved out of the tropics. Tropical Disturbance 02F subsequently developed on November 18 to the northeast of Port Vila, Vanuatu and over the next few days slowly moved to the west-southwest while gradually developing further. The system almost developed into a weak tropical cyclone as it moved along the Vanuatu Islands causing some locally heavy rain, minor damage and flash flooding, before it was last noted November 24 as it moved out of RSMC Nadi's area of responsibility. After 02F left the tropics, the basin remained quiet until early December when the Australian monsoon pushed eastwards along the South Pacific convergence zone, and a Madden–Julian oscillation caused an increase in tropical cyclone activity. On December 9, RSMC Nadi started to monitor the precursor systems to Tropical Depression 03F and Severe Tropical Cyclone Evan.

== Systems ==
=== Tropical Depression 02F ===
- Tropical depression (Australian scale)
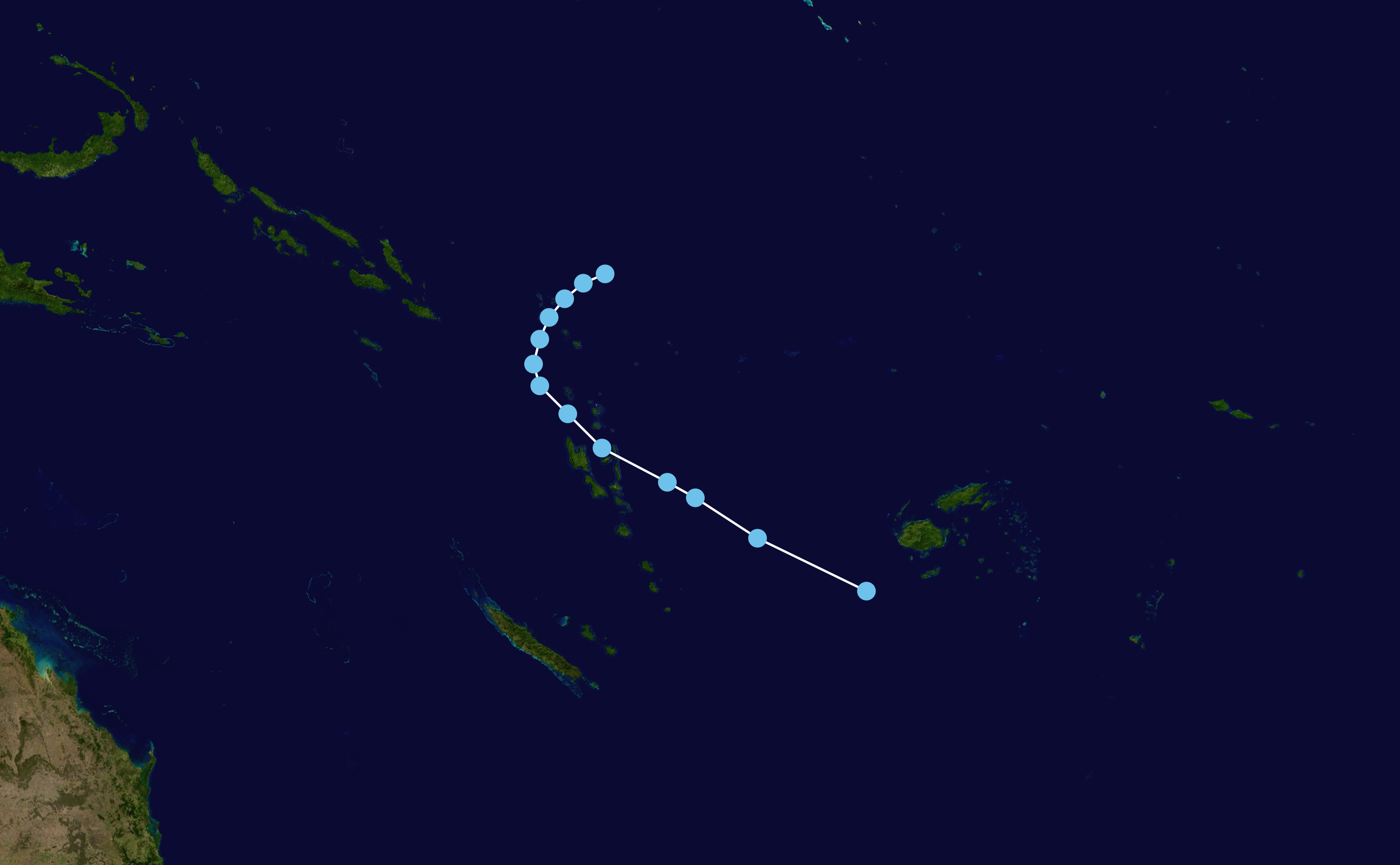
- Duration: November 18 – November 24
- Peak intensity: 45 km/h (30 mph) (10-min); 1001 hPa (mbar)

Tropical Disturbance 02F developed within a trough of low pressure to the north-east of the Santa Cruz Islands during November 18. Over the next few days the system moved slowly and gradually developed further in an area of low vertical wind shear and was declared a tropical depression during November 20. The system subsequently turned towards the south-southeast and impacted Vanuatu, before it moved into an area of unfavourable conditions for further development, including high vertical wind shear and lower sea surface temperatures during November 22. As a result, convection surrounding the system significantly decreased and detached from the systems low level circulation center. The system was subsequently last noted by the FMS during November 24, as it approached the subtropics as a former tropical depression. There was no damage recorded when the depression impacted Vanuatu between November 20–22. A rainfall total of 91 mm (3.6 in) was recorded at the Whitegrass Observation Station on Tanna Island during November 21, while a total of 108 mm (4.3 in) was recorded on Aneityum Island during November 22. The trough of low pressure associated with 02F, brought strong winds over Western and Southern parts of Fiji during November 22, with Ono-i-lau recording the highest sustained winds of 50 km/h (31 mph) and gusts of up to 77 km/h (48 mph).

=== Tropical Depression 03F ===
- Tropical depression (Australian scale)
- Subtropical depression (SSHWS)
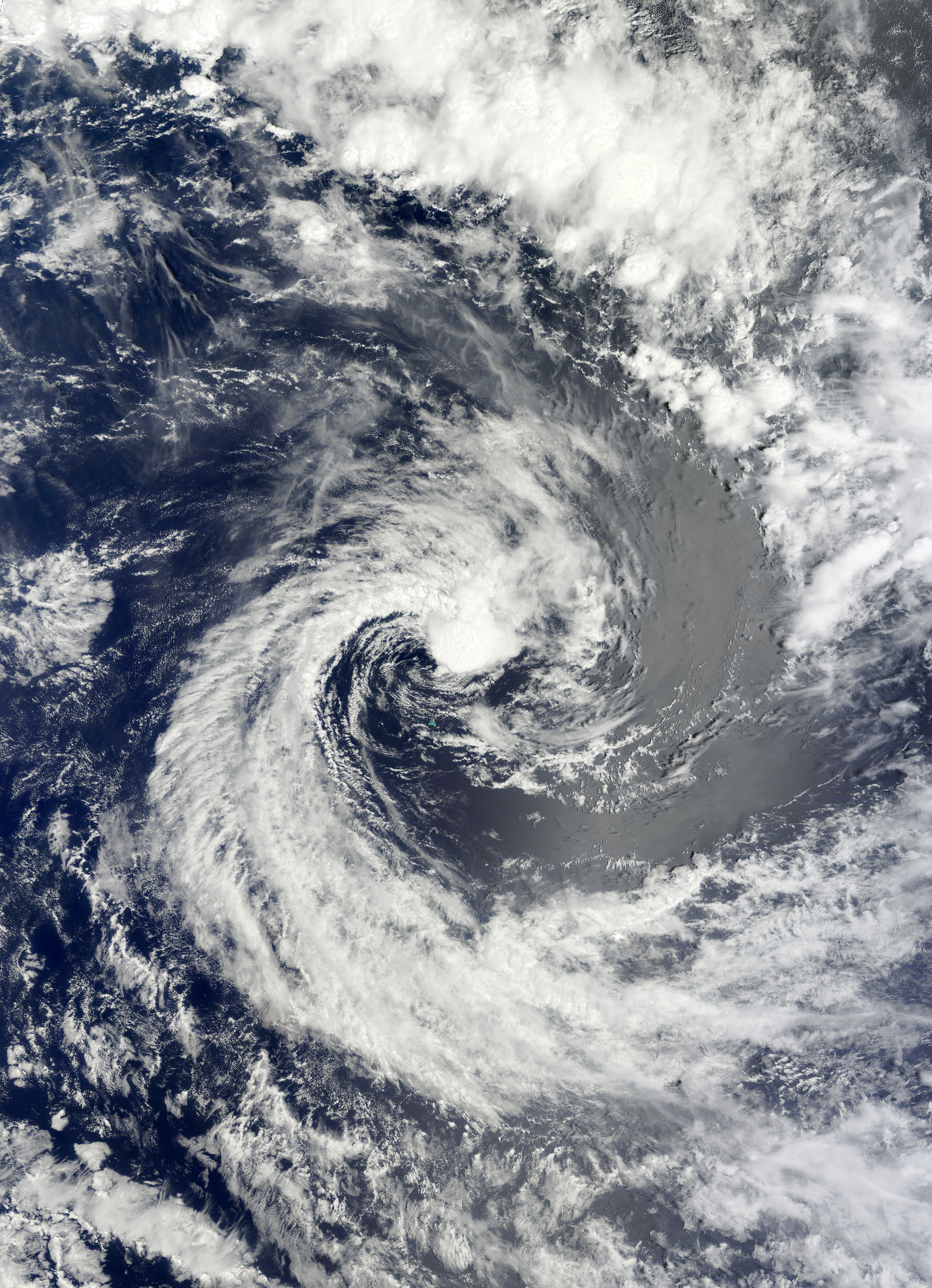
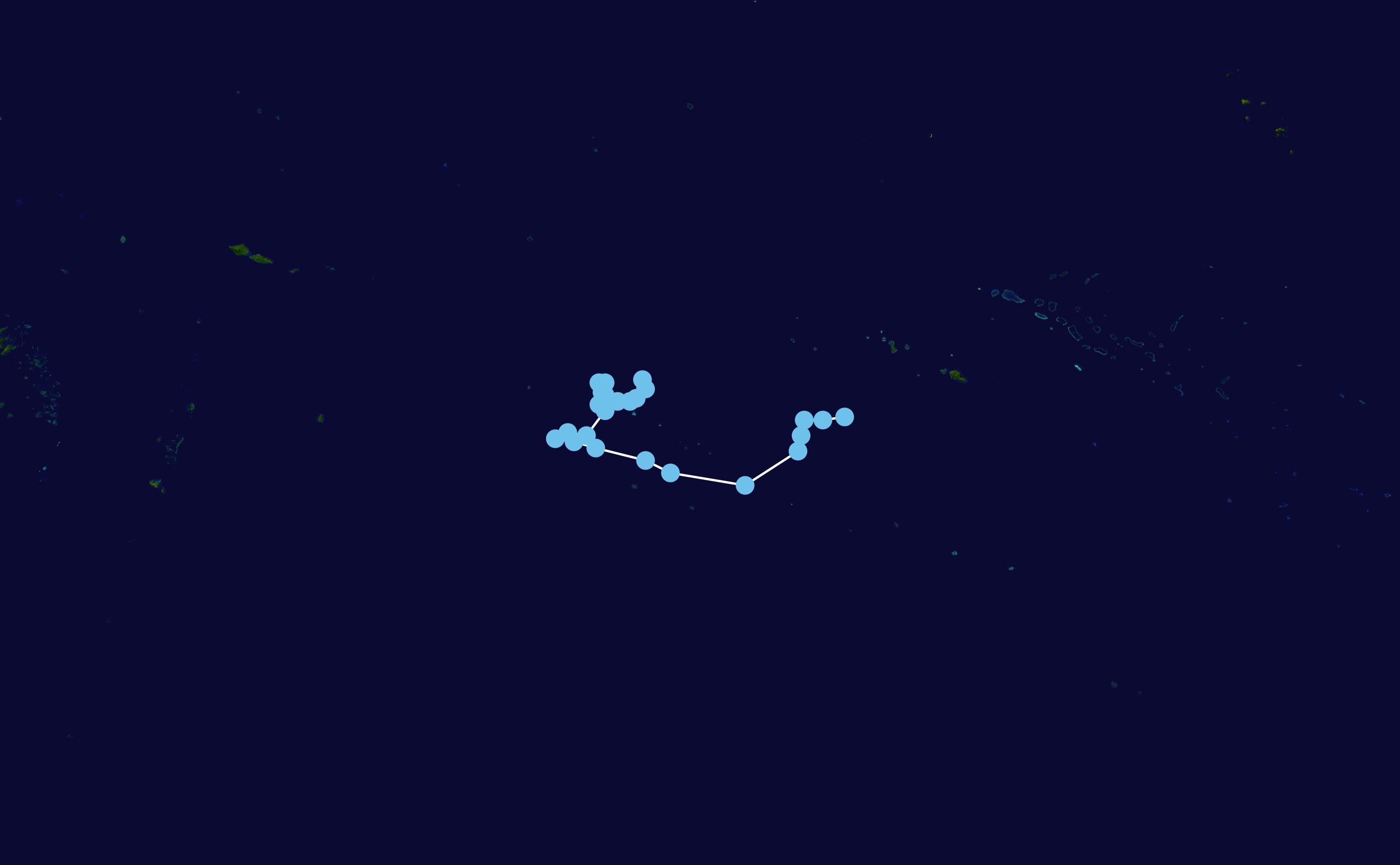
- Duration: December 9 – December 17
- Peak intensity: Winds not specified; 997 hPa (mbar)

During December 9, RSMC Nadi reported that Tropical Depression 03F had developed in an area of high vertical windshear, about 600 km (375 mi) to the northeast of Avarua on the Cook Island of Rarotonga. It was classified as a Subtropical system by the SSHWS as it reached peak intensity on December 13 but failed to be a tropical cyclone. 03F then dissipated on December 17 near a subtropical ridge.

=== Severe Tropical Cyclone Evan ===
- Category 4 severe tropical cyclone (Australian scale)
- Category 4 tropical cyclone (SSHWS)
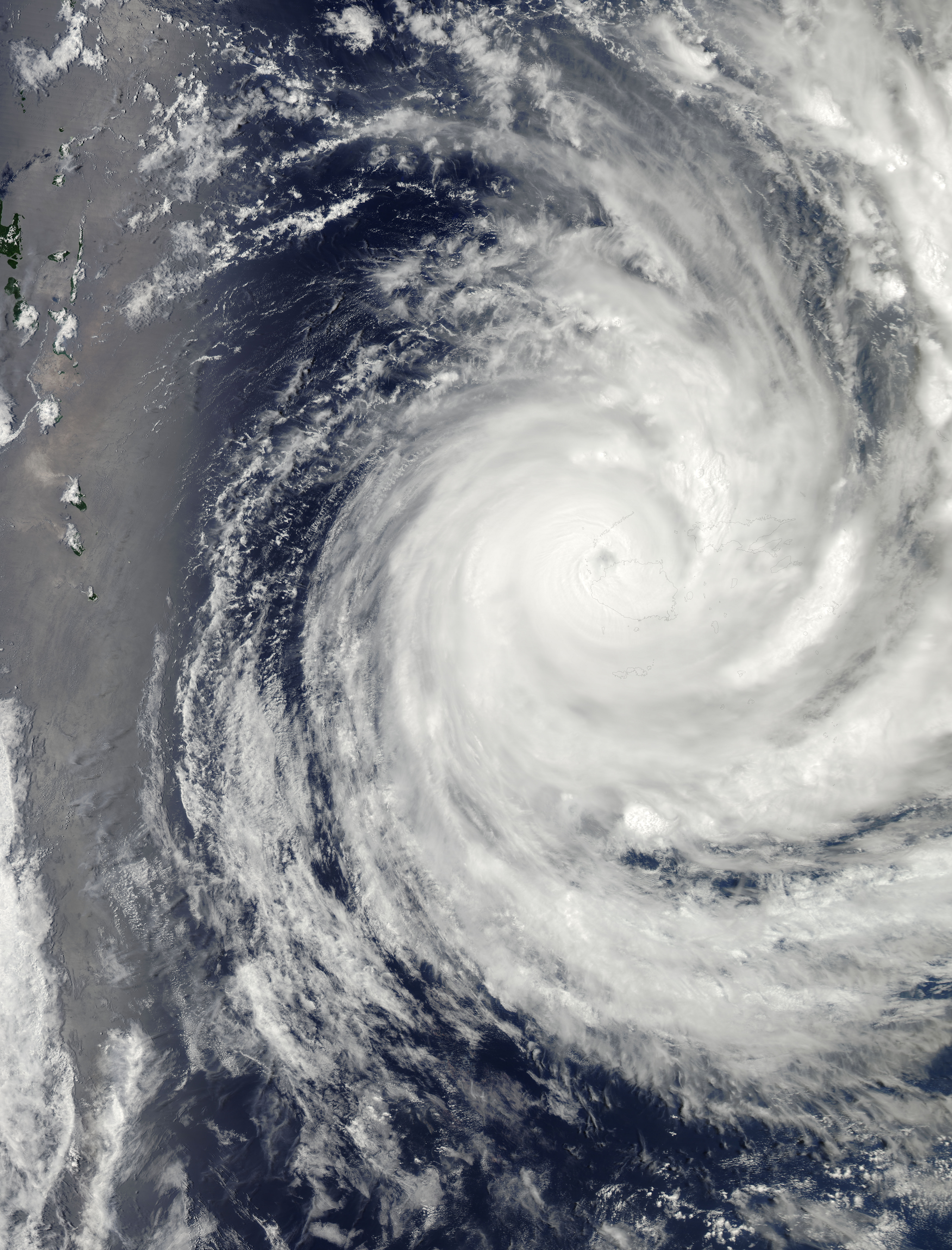
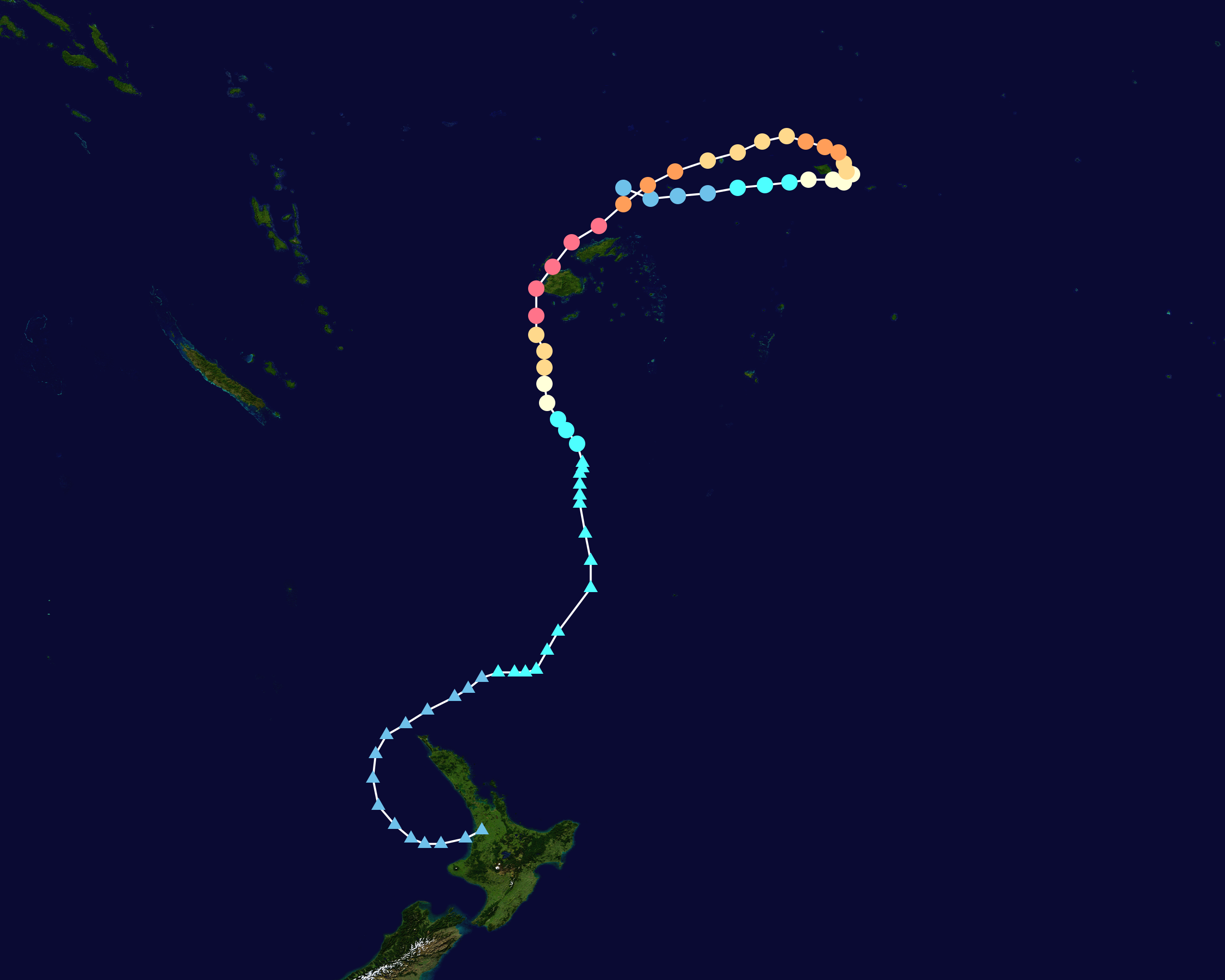
- Duration: December 9 – December 19
- Peak intensity: 185 km/h (115 mph) (10-min); 943 hPa (mbar)

On December 9, RSMC Nadi started to monitor a weak tropical depression, that had developed within the South Pacific convergence zone, about 700 km (435 mi) to the northeast of Suva, Fiji. Over the next two days, the depression gradually developed further in an area of low vertical windshear and favourable sea surface temperatures, as it was steered eastwards by an upper level ridge of high pressure. During December 11, the JTWC started to issue warnings and designated the system as Tropical Cyclone 04P, after 1-minute sustained winds had become equivalent to a tropical storm. RSMC Nadi then reported early the next day that the system had become a category one tropical cyclone and named it Evan, while it was located about 410 km (255 mi) to the west of Pago Pago on the American Samoan island of Tutuila.

The cyclone struck Samoa on December 13 with category 2 strength winds of more than 110 km/h (70 mph), causing widespread damage in the capital, Apia. Most of the roads out of Apia have reportedly been cut off by floodwaters. The system is expected to head south towards Fiji. On December 13, Tropical Cyclone Evan battered Samoa and American Samoa with wind gusts up to 175 km/h (110 mph), before roaring over Fiji as a Category 4 storm on December 17, with winds reaching up to 230 km/h (145 mph). It then weakened to a Tropical Depression on October 19 as its remnants became exposed. Its remnants continued to move southerly direction which gave heavy rains and strong winds to New Zealand on December 21 and 22 and fully dissipated on late on December 23.

Evan killed at least 14 people on Samoa and left behind severe damage. The US Ambassador to New Zealand and Samoa David Huebner confirmed the United States had provided NZ$ 60,000 to the Samoan Red Cross for relief operations. New Zealand authorities sent NZ$ 50,000 on December 15, as well as the P-3 Orion plane to search for the missing fishermen. Two days later the New Zealand Foreign Affairs Minister Murray McCully announced an additional NZ$ 550,000 was to be made available to the Samoan government, as well as the Samoan Red Cross and any agencies on the ground that might need it. Five additional New Zealand Red Cross workers were also sent to support local efforts. As the legislators prepared to receive initial assessments of the economic damage wrecked by Evan, the bill was expected to be at least NZ$ 200,000,000, and possibly rise as high as 300 million.

=== Severe Tropical Cyclone Freda ===
- Category 4 severe tropical cyclone (Australian scale)
- Category 3 tropical cyclone (SSHWS)
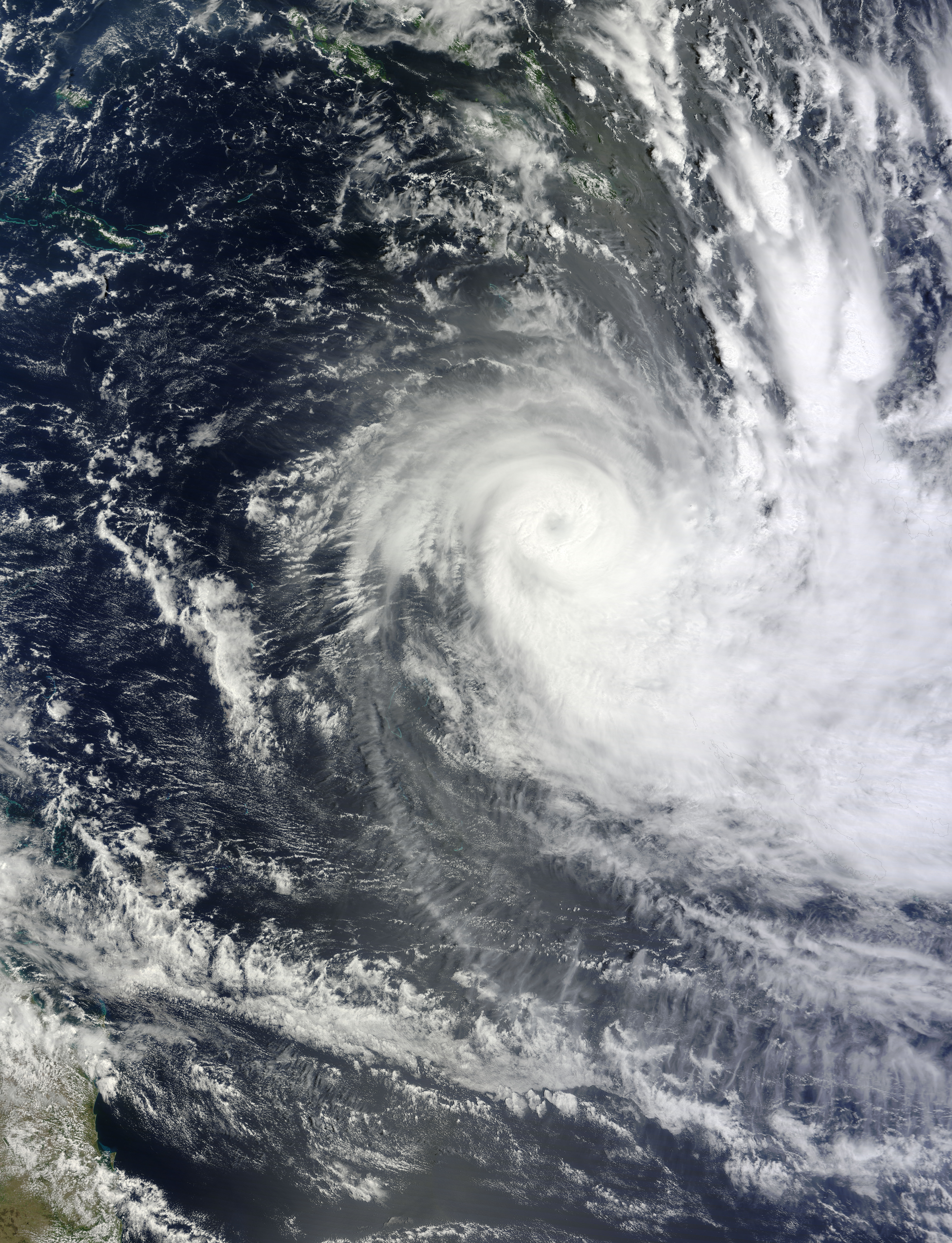
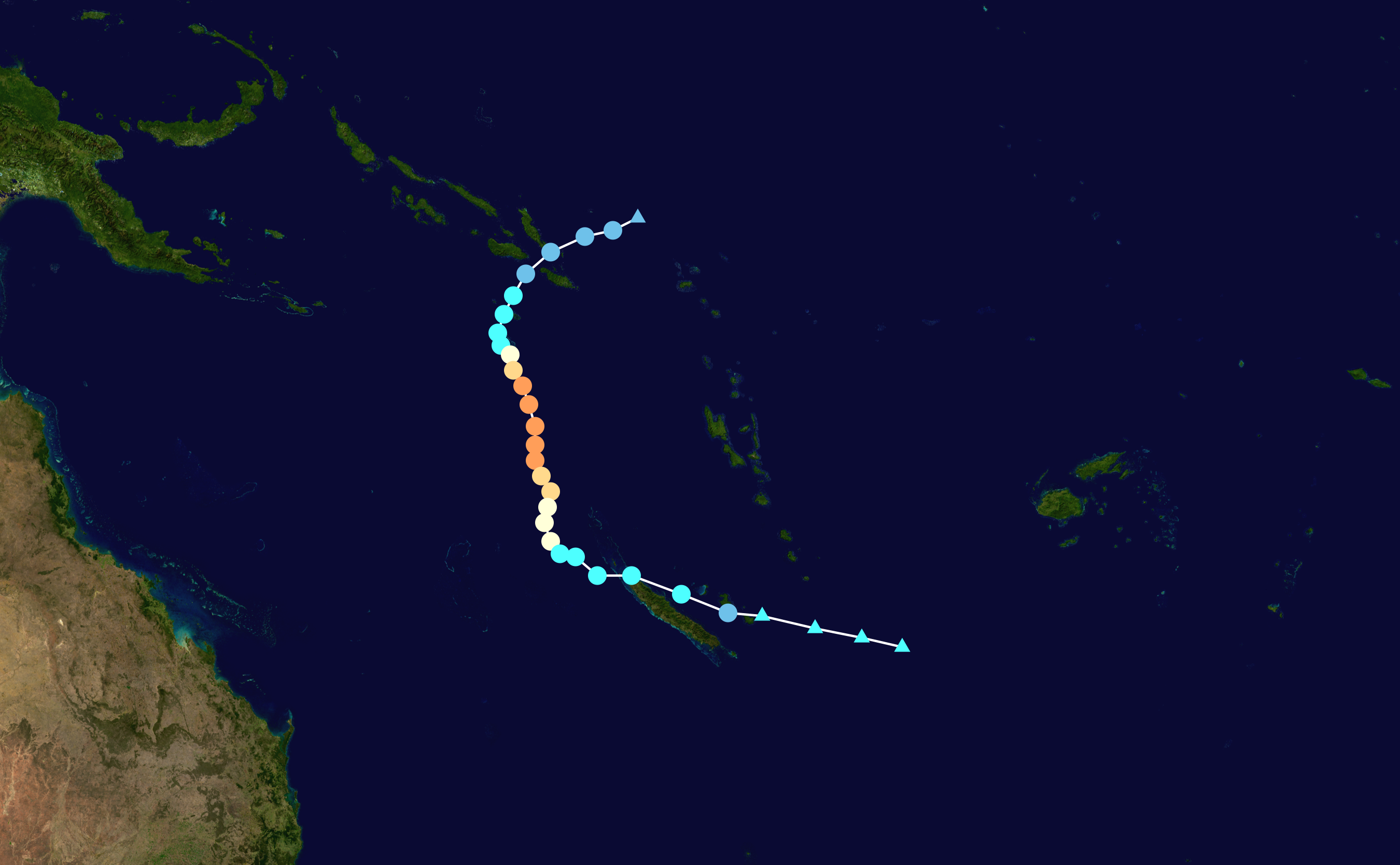
- Duration: December 26 – January 4
- Peak intensity: 185 km/h (115 mph) (10-min); 940 hPa (mbar)

On December 26, RSMC Nadi reported that Tropical Disturbance 05F had developed within an area of low to moderate vertical windshear about 1075 km (670 mi) to the north of Port Vila, Vanuatu. During that day as the system moved towards the west, convection surrounding the centre and the general organization of the system increased, before RSMC Nadi reported that the system had developed into a tropical depression. During December 27, the depression started to move towards the southwest and the southern Solomon Islands, as convection surrounding the centre and the general organization of the system continued to increase. The system then passed near the Southern Solomon Islands early the next day, before the JTWC designated the depression as Tropical Cyclone 06P and initiated advisories on it as the system had become equivalent to a tropical storm. Later that day RSMC Nadi reported that the depression had become a category one tropical cyclone and named it Freda, as it continued to move towards the southwest and passed over Rennell Island. During December 29, Freda continued to move towards the south-southwest, crossed 160°E and briefly moved into the Australian region, before it started to move towards the south-southeast along the western edge of the subtropical ridge of high pressure and moved back into the South Pacific basin. During that day the system developed an 20 km (10 mi) wide eye while significantly intensifying further, with RSMC Nadi reporting by 1800 UTC that Freda had become a category 3 severe tropical cyclone with 10-minute sustained windspeeds of 150 km/h (95 mph).

During December 30, Freda continued to intensify further, before RSMC Nadi reported that Freda had peaked as a category 4 severe tropical cyclone with 10-minute sustained windspeeds of 185 km/h (115 mph). The JTWC subsequently followed suit and reported that Freda had peaked with 1-minute sustained windspeeds of 205 km/h (125 mph) which made it equivalent to a category 3 hurricane on the SSHS. After it had peaked, Freda started to quickly weaken as it continued to move towards the south-southeast, as vertical windshear over the system increased and caused convection over Freda's northern semicircle to gradually wear away. By 0000 UTC on January 1, the JTWC reported that Freda had become equivalent to a category one hurricane, while RSMC Nadi had reported that the system had weakened into a category 2 tropical cyclone. Throughout that day, Freda continued to weaken before at 1800 UTC after deep convection had become displaced to the east of the low level circulation center, RSMC Nadi reported that the cyclone had weakened into a tropical depression. During the next day the JTWC issued their final advisory on the system after the low level circulation center had become fully exposed before the remnant tropical depression crossed the northern part of New Caledonia's Grande Terre Island. After crossing New Caledonia's biggest island, Freda started to move towards the southeast between Grande Terre and the Loyalty Islands, while the JTWC reported that Freda had become a subtropical cyclone, as it was positioned under a strong subtropical westerly flow. The remnant depression was subsequently last noted during January 4, as it dissipated about 630 km (390 mi) to the southwest of Nadi, Fiji.

As of December 29, the storm has hit the Solomon Islands with strong winds and heavy rain. The cyclone was full force on Rennell Island and the country's major island of Makira, which so far was the hardest hit. Winds of up to 130 kilometres per hour were expected in Rennell and Bellona Islands. Freda is expected to affect the country until early Monday morning. On December 30, New Caledonia was being warned to prepare for the arrival of Freda on January 2. The category four system was weakening as it headed south-south east at about 13 kilometres per hour. On December 30, Freda moved across the southern Solomon Islands. As Cyclone Freda weakened, it struck New Caledonia as a tropical storm at about 0000 UTC on January 2, 2013.

At the height of the storm one man drowned in New Caledonia, while another person was left missing after attempting to cross a swollen river while around 3200 people were without power.

=== Tropical Depression 08F ===
- Tropical depression (Australian scale)
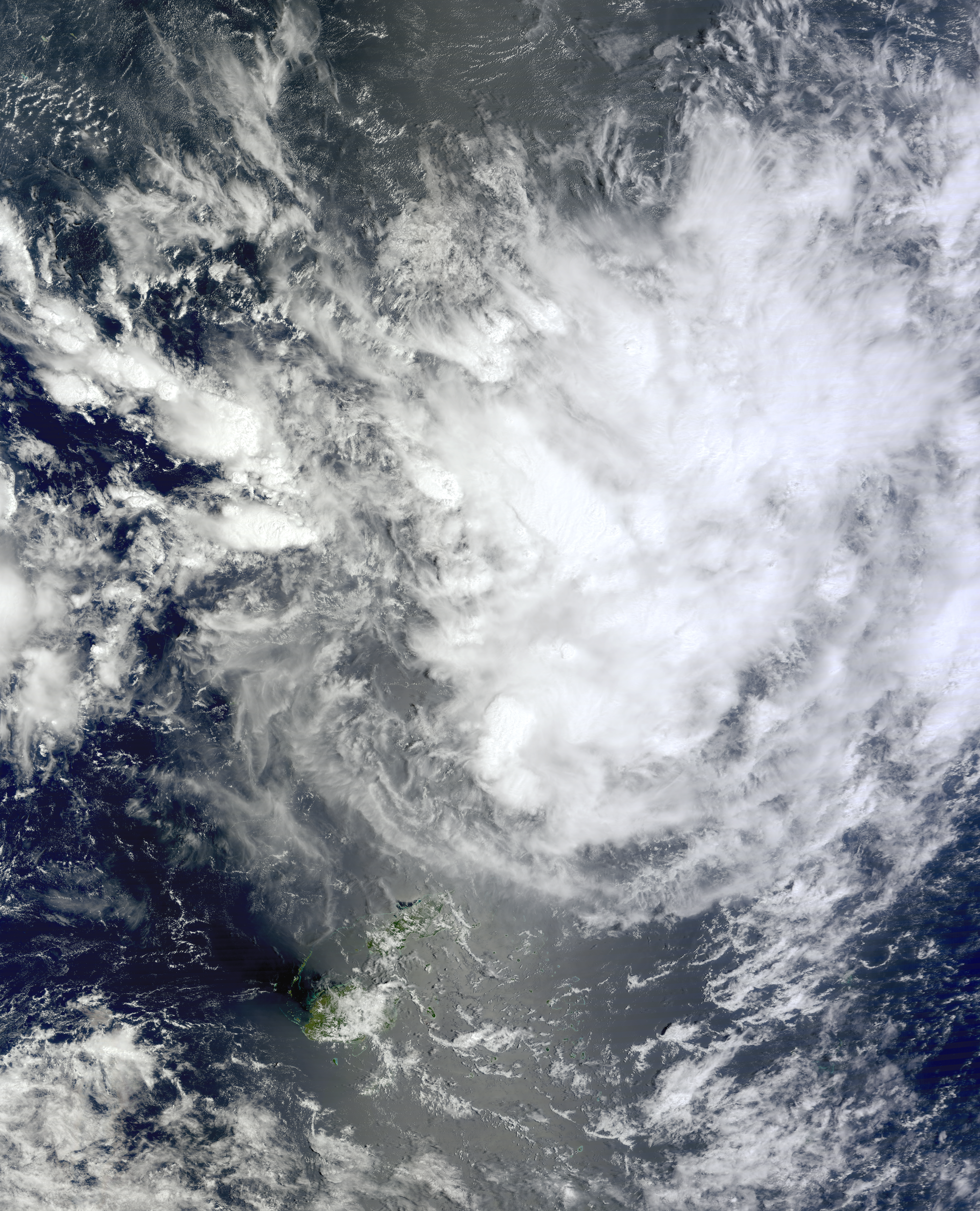
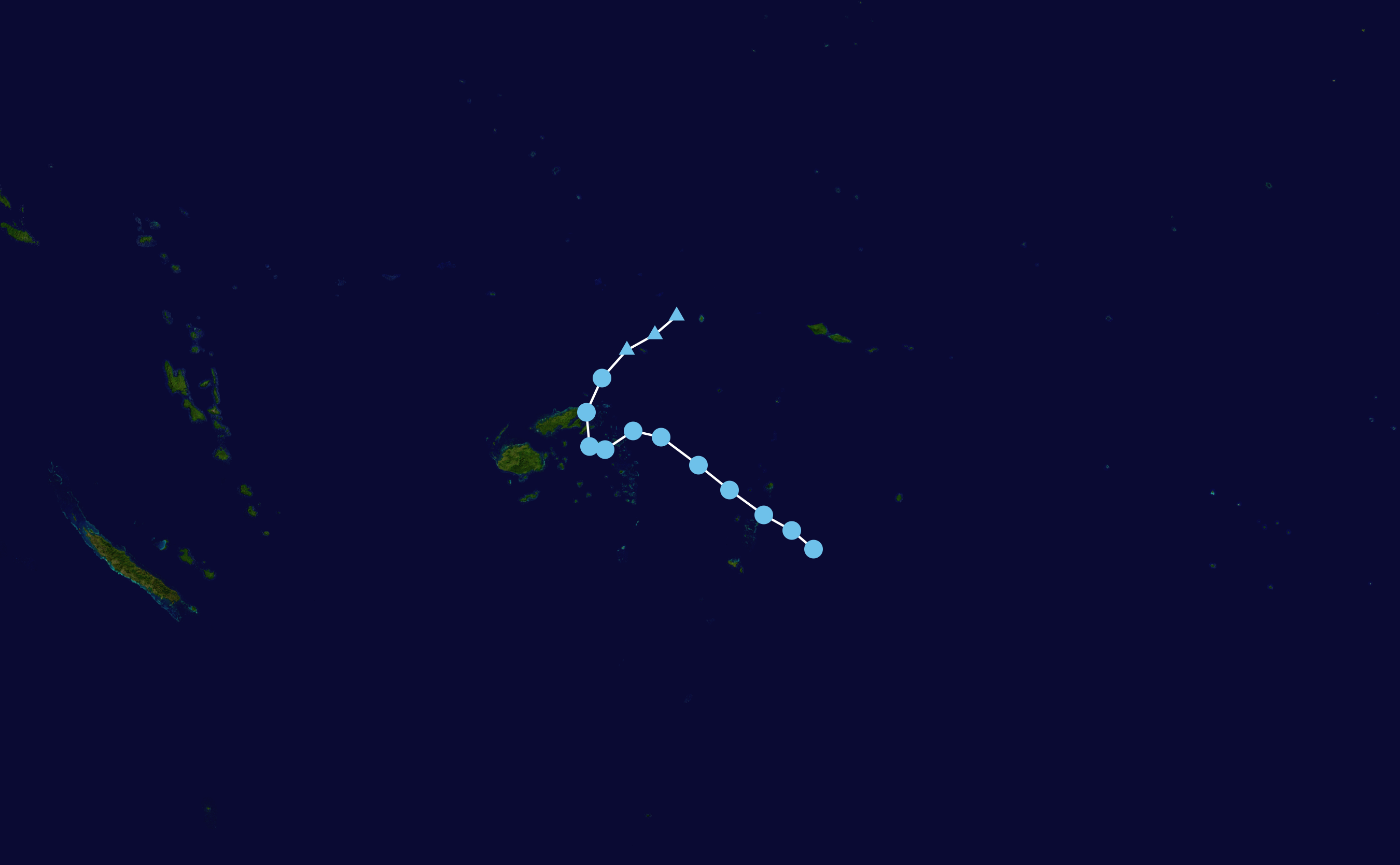
- Duration: January 9 – January 15
- Peak intensity: 45 km/h (30 mph) (10-min); 999 hPa (mbar)

On January 9, RSMC Nadi reported that Tropical Disturbance 08F had developed about 270 km (170 mi) to the northeast of Wallis Island.

=== Severe Tropical Cyclone Garry ===
- Category 3 severe tropical cyclone (Australian scale)
- Category 2 tropical cyclone (SSHWS)
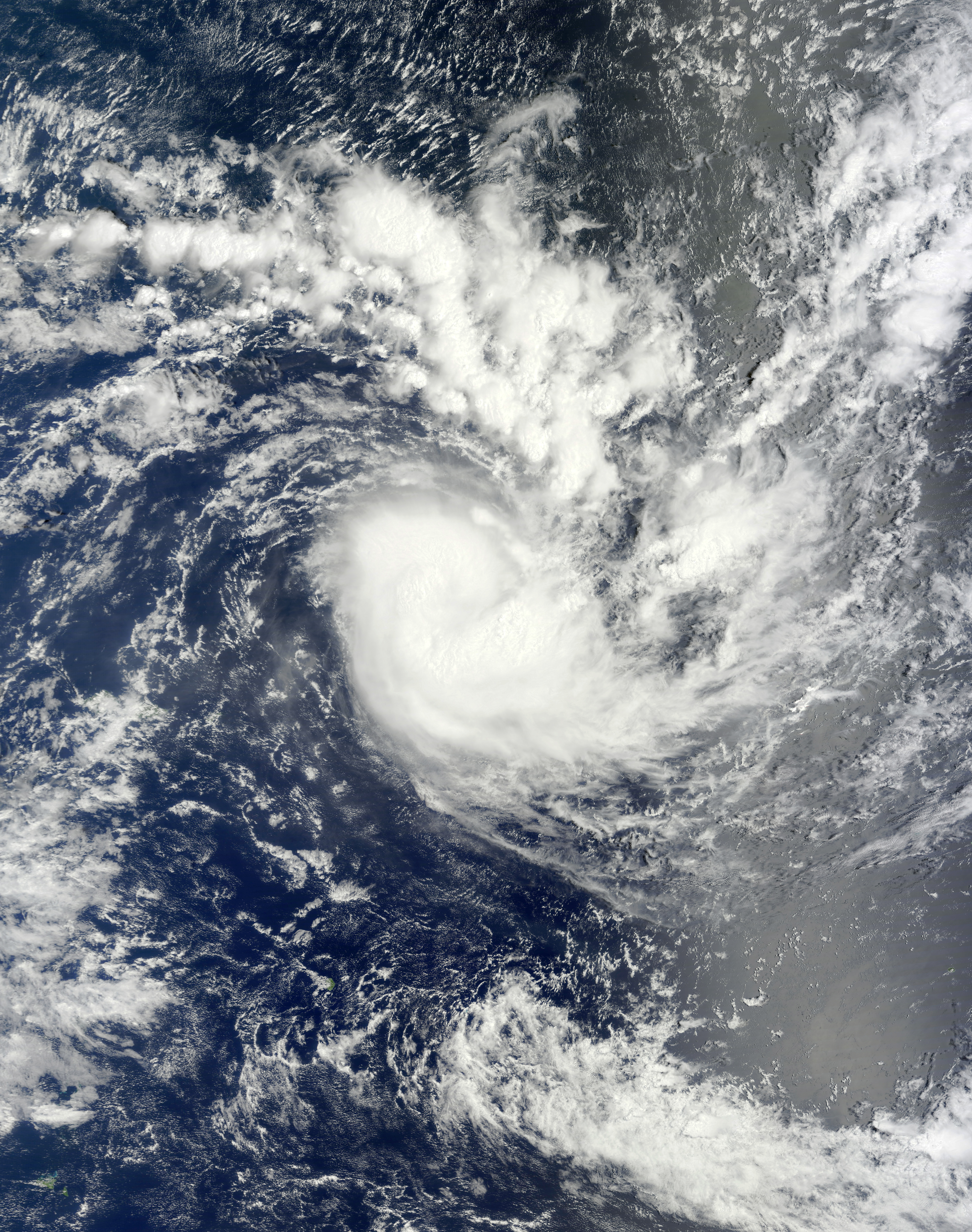
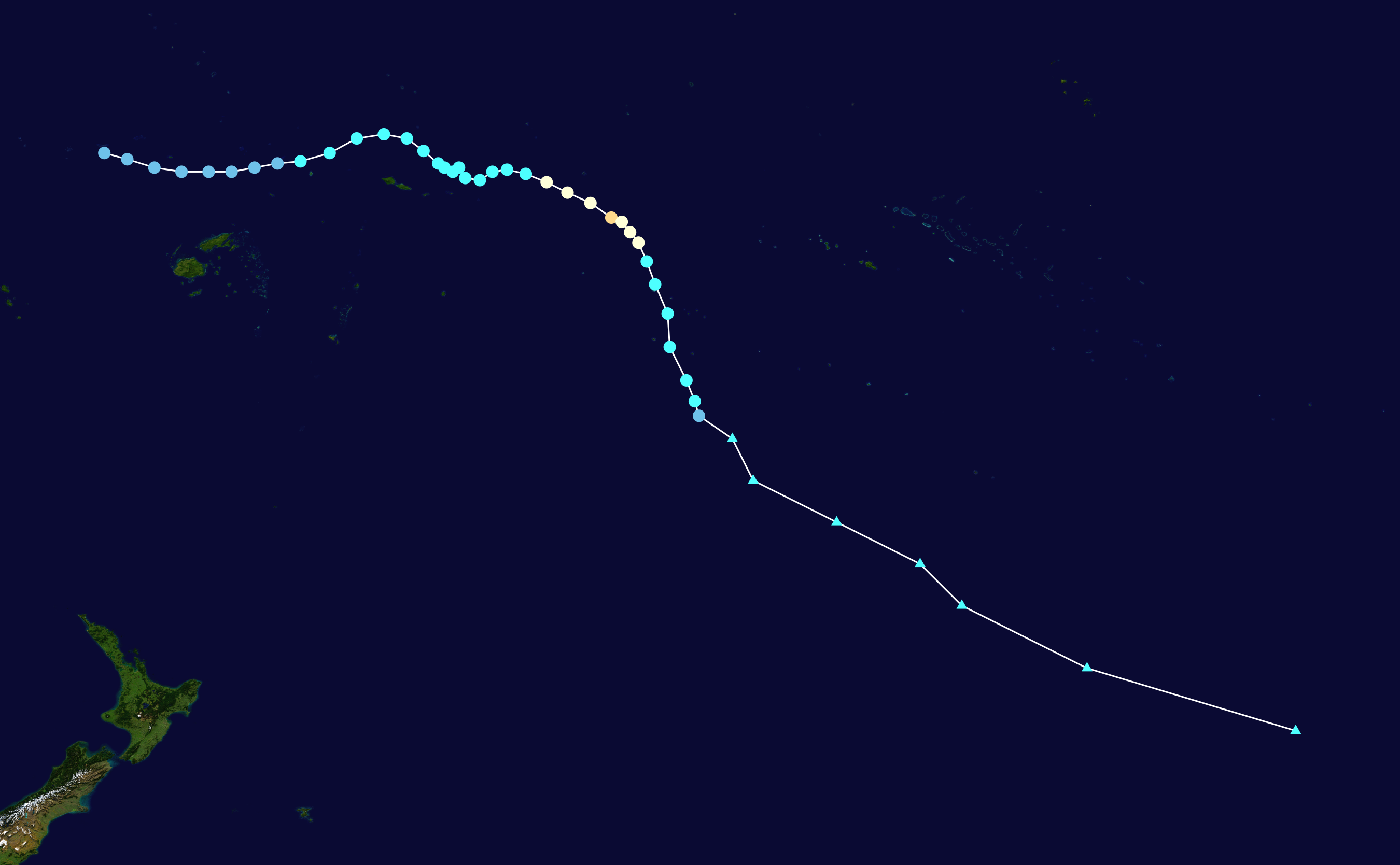
- Duration: January 14 – January 27
- Peak intensity: 150 km/h (90 mph) (10-min); 965 hPa (mbar)

On January 14, RSMC Nadi reported that Tropical Disturbance 09F had developed about 615 km (380 mi) to the southeast of Honiara on the Solomon Island of Guadalcanal. Tropical Cyclone Garry was forecast to intensify as a Category 1 with 1-min sustained winds of 65 knots briefly according to the JTWC. However, it intensified to a Category 2 with 1-min sustained winds of 85 knots according to the JTWC. On January 27 while 1,019 km (635 mi) southwest of Bora Bora it transitioned to an extra-tropical storm.

=== Tropical Depression 11F ===
- Tropical depression (Australian scale)
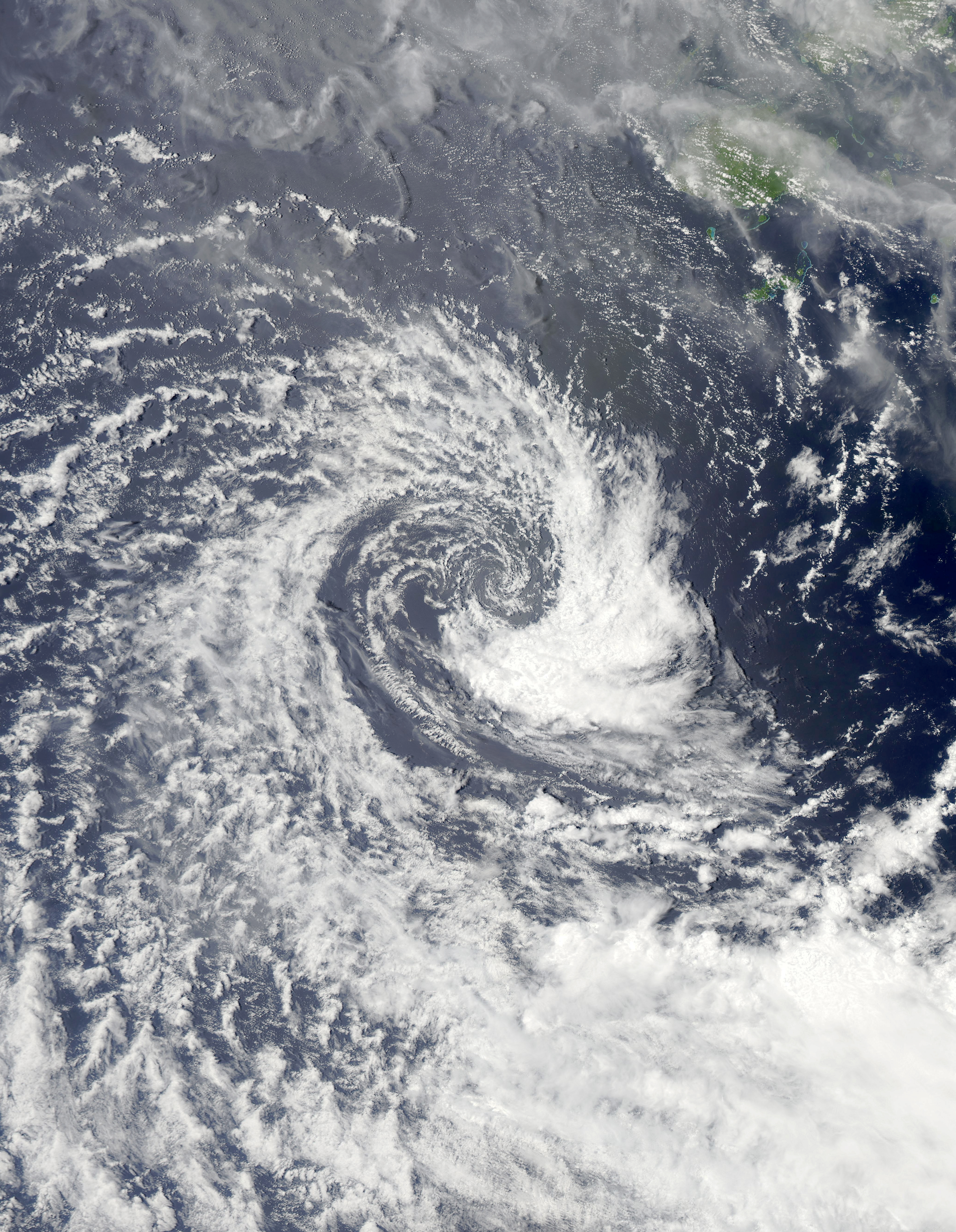
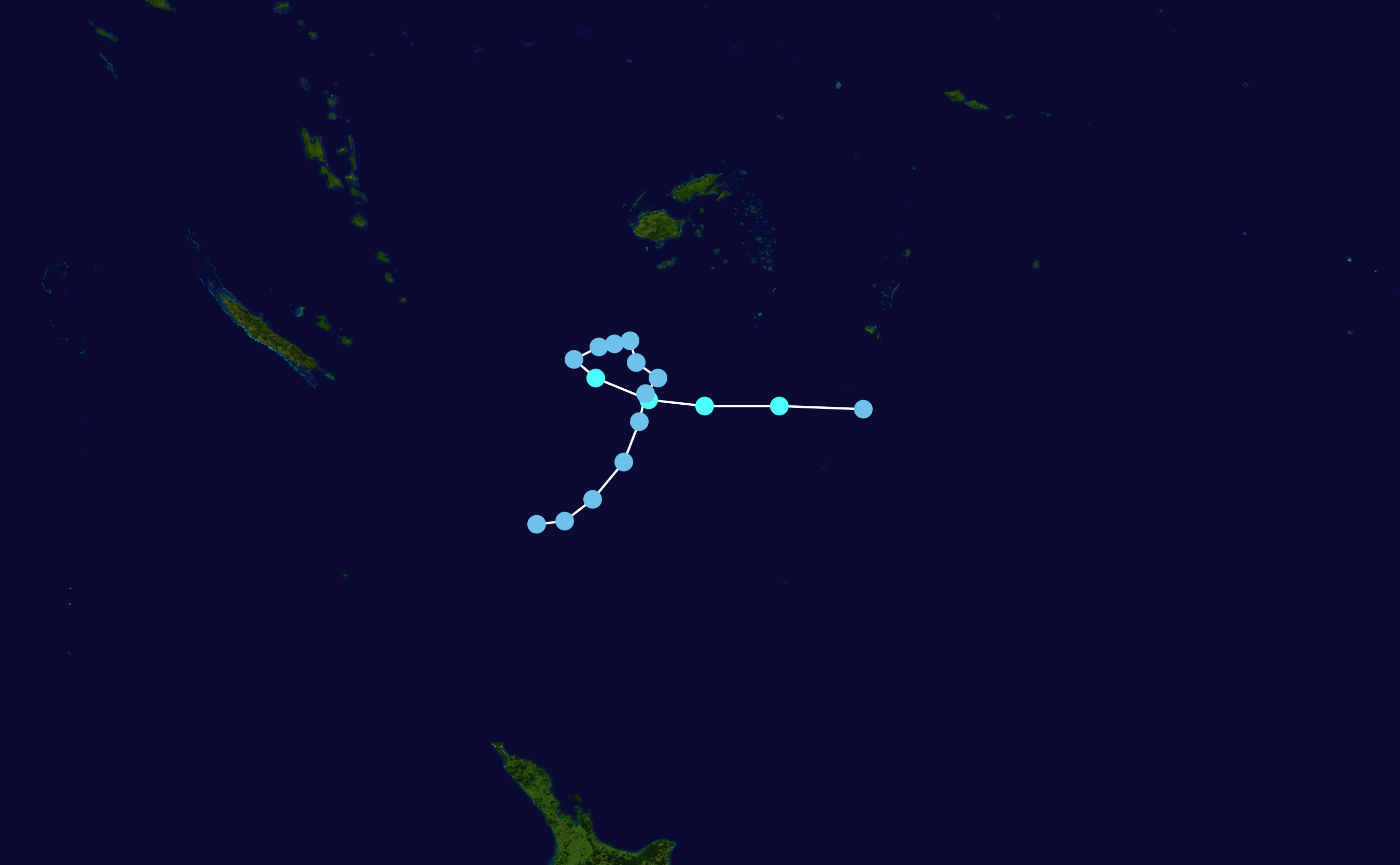
- Duration: January 26 – January 30
- Peak intensity: 55 km/h (35 mph) (10-min); 995 hPa (mbar)

On January 26, RSMC Nadi reported that Tropical Depression 11F had developed within an area of high vertical windshear about 614 km (380 mi) to the southeast of Suva, Fiji.

=== Tropical Cyclone Haley ===
- Category 1 tropical cyclone (Australian scale)
- Tropical storm (SSHWS)
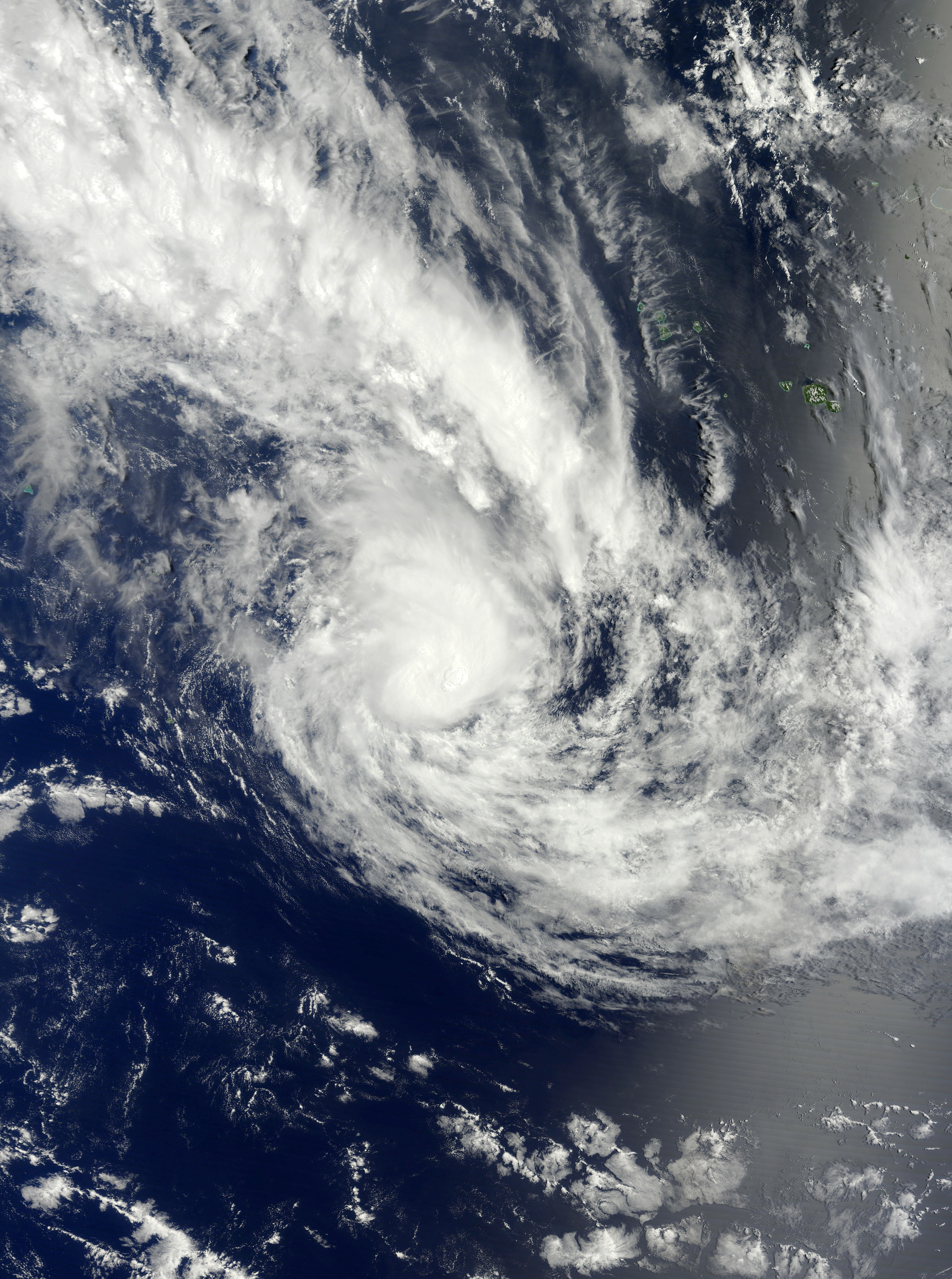
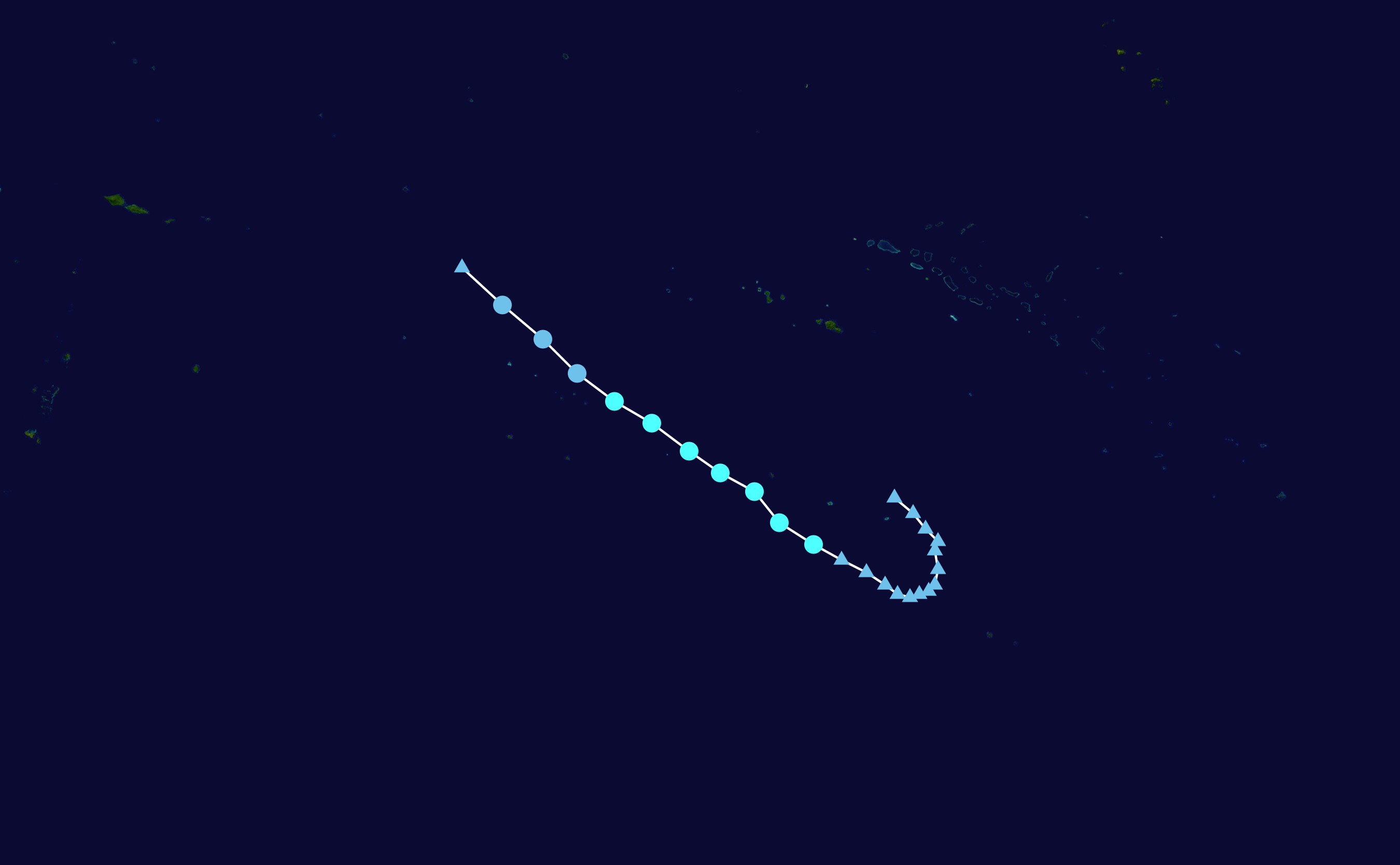
- Duration: February 7 – February 11
- Peak intensity: 75 km/h (45 mph) (10-min); 990 hPa (mbar)

On February 7, RSMC Nadi reported that Tropical Disturbance 14F had developed under an upper level ridge of high pressure in an area of low vertical windshear, about 450 km (280 mi) to the east of the Cook Island: Suwarrow. A few days later, it strengthened to Tropical Cyclone Haley. On February 11, RSMC Nadi issues its final advisory for ex-Tropical Cyclone Haley having agreed that it would move South-East and weaken further. By February 11, Haley weakened into a tropical depression, with the low level circulation center becoming fully exposed, with most of the convection displaced to the far east due to wind shear from the west, overall decreasing its organization.

=== Tropical Disturbance 16F ===
- Tropical disturbance (Australian scale)
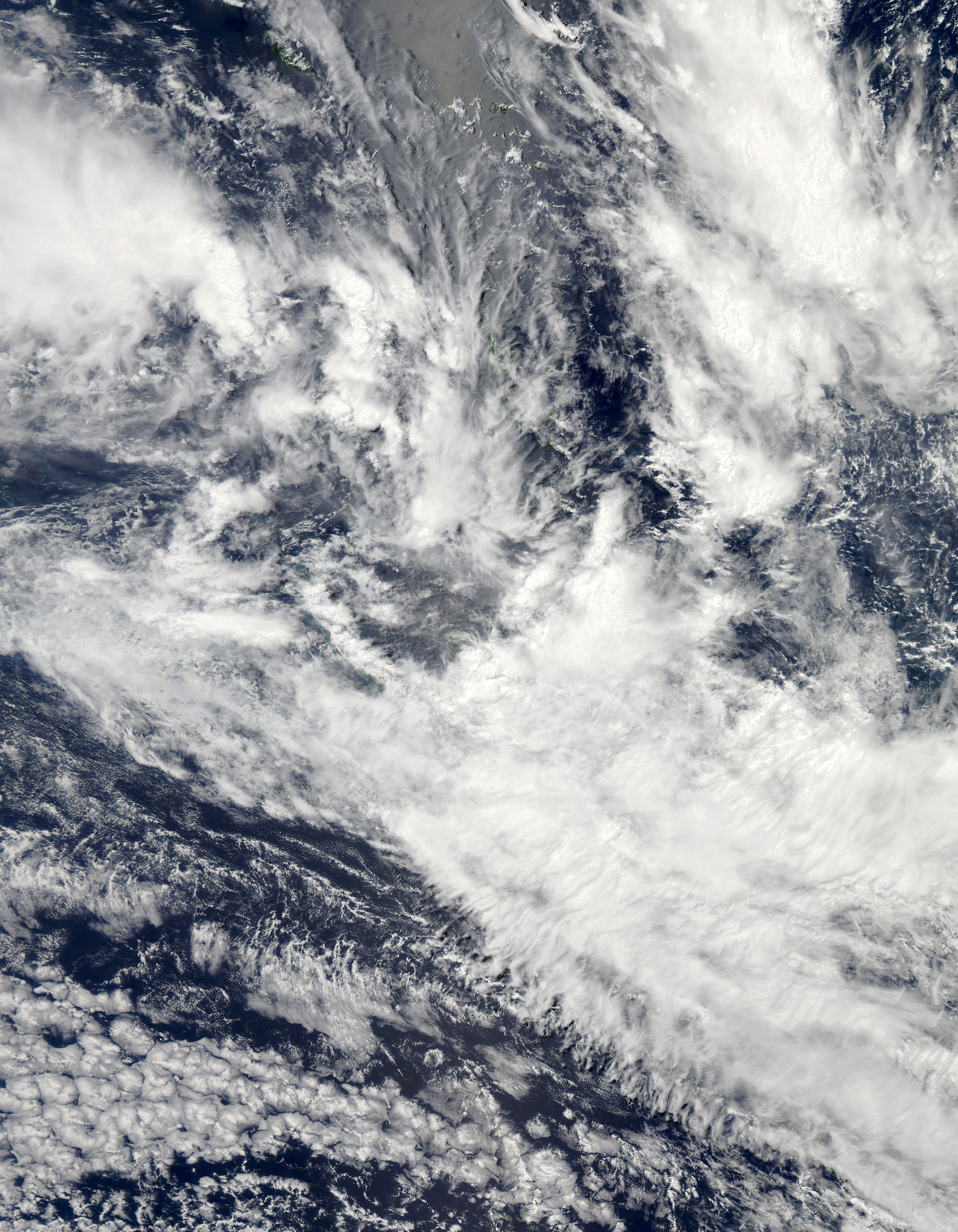
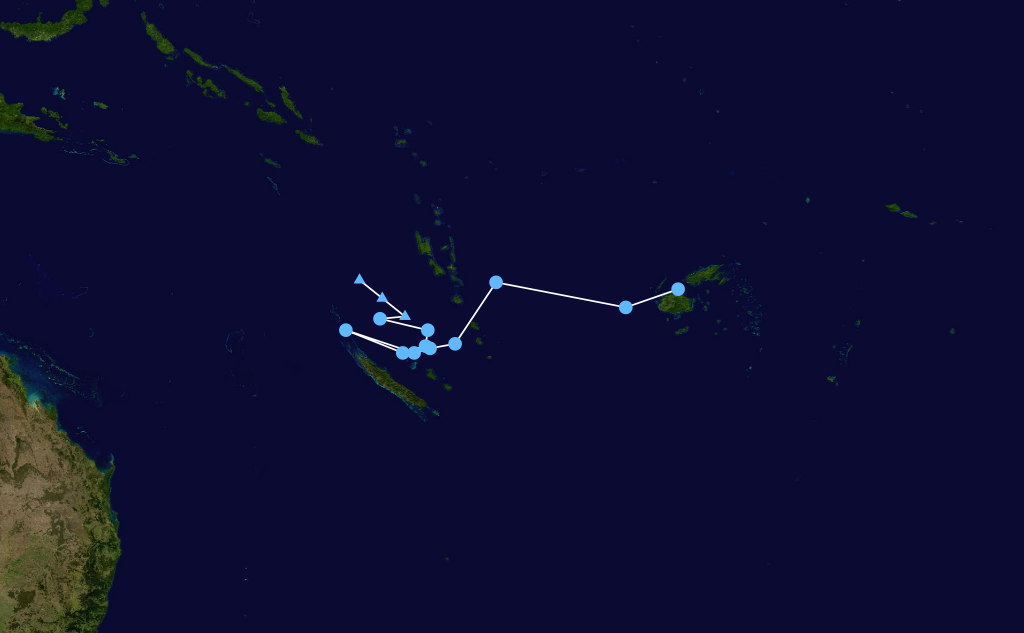
- Duration: February 28 – March 7
- Peak intensity: Winds not specified; 998 hPa (mbar)

On February 28, RSMC Nadi started to monitor a tropical disturbance that had developed, about 390 km (240 mi) to the south of Honiara on the Solomon Island of Guadalcanal. The system resulted in gale warnings being issued in Tonga.

The system was last noted on March 7, while located about 160 km (100 mi) to the south-west of Suva, near the Fijian island of Matuku.

=== Severe Tropical Cyclone Sandra ===
- Category 4 severe tropical cyclone (Australian scale)
- Category 3 tropical cyclone (SSHWS)
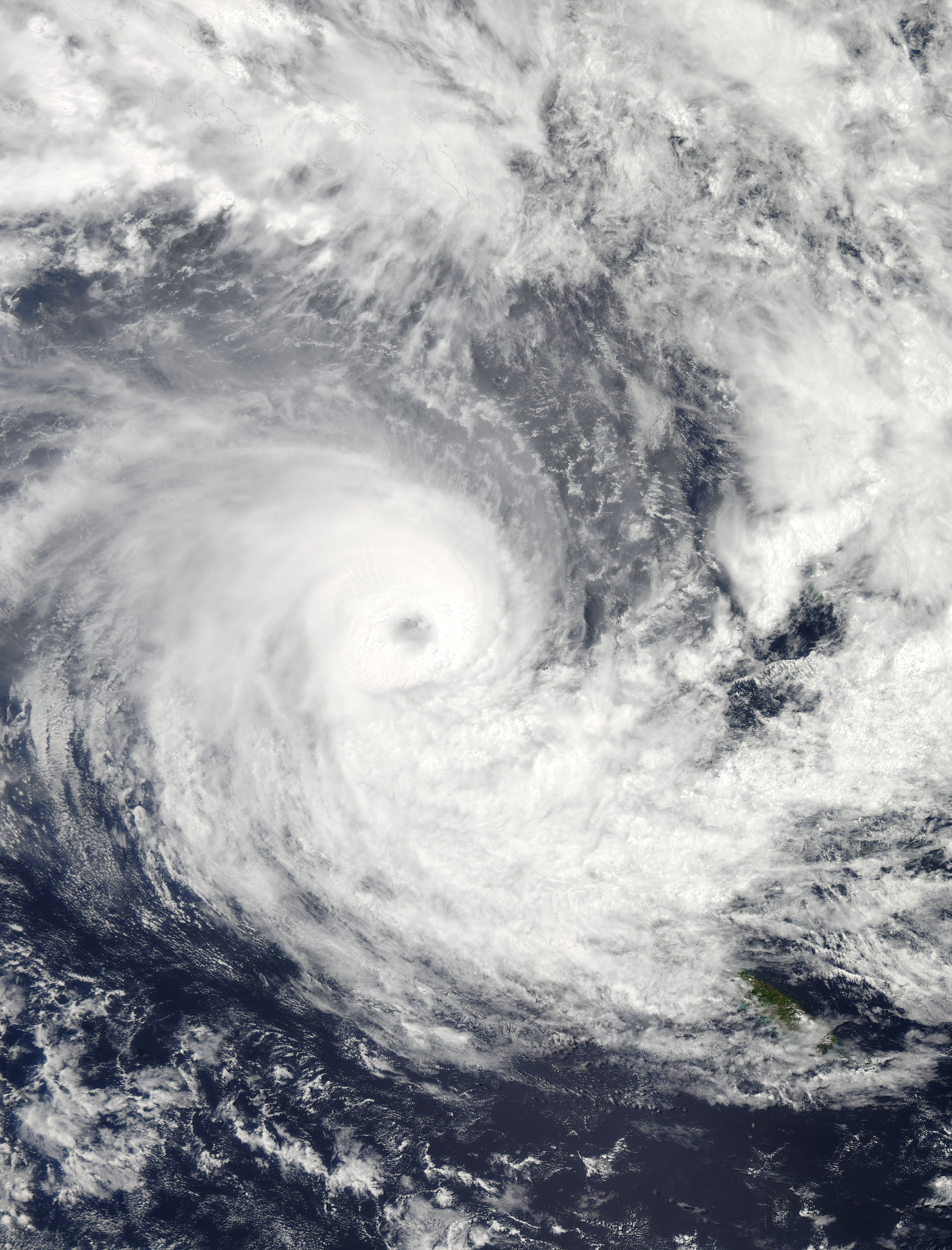
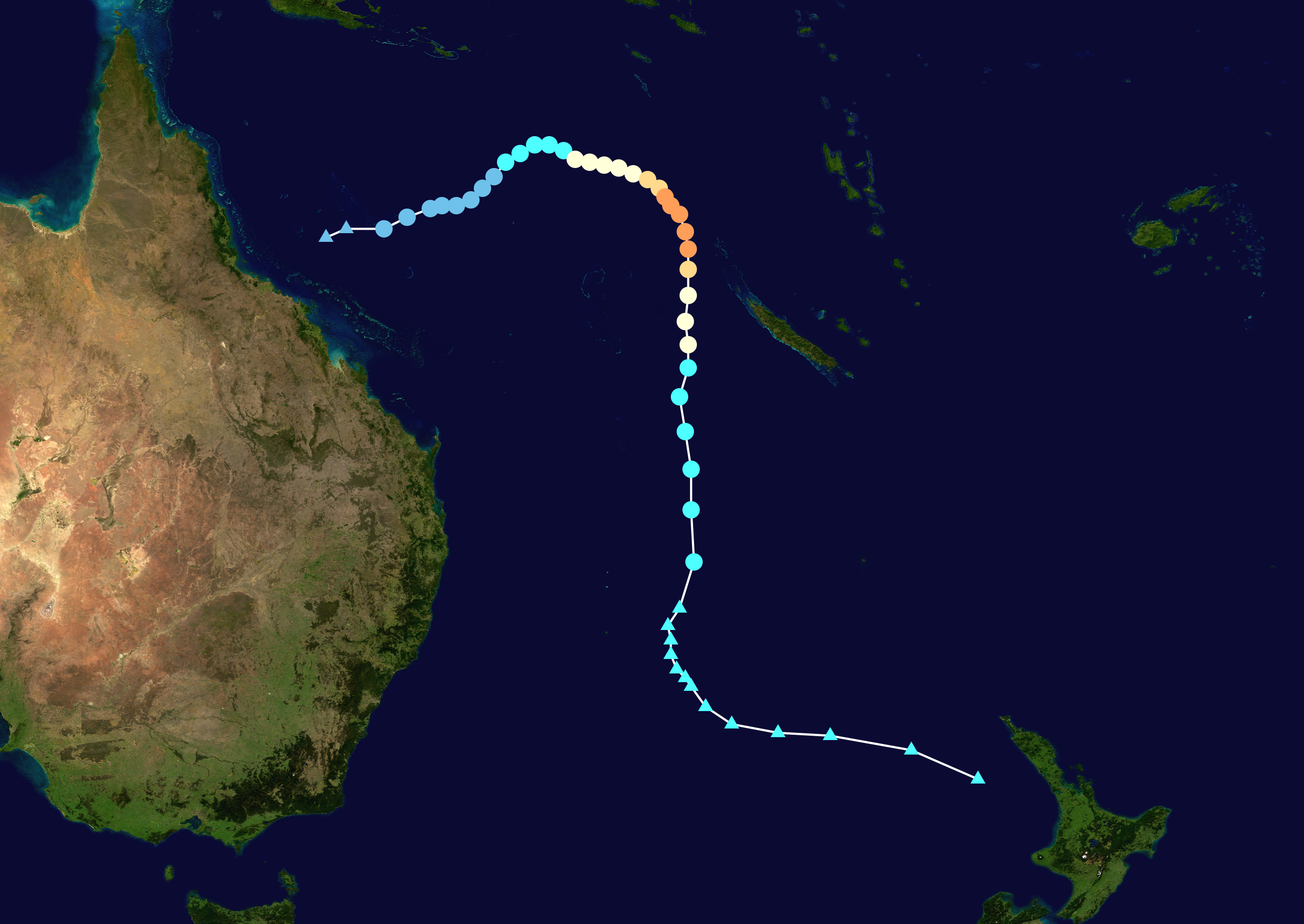
- Duration: March 9 (Entered basin) – March 14
- Peak intensity: 185 km/h (115 mph) (10-min); 930 hPa (mbar)

Cyclone Sandra formed off the Queensland coast on March 8. During March 9, it moved into the South Pacific basin from the Australian region as a Category 3 Severe Tropical Cyclone, while located about 700 km (435 mi) to the south of Honiara in the Solomon Islands.

Upon reaching Category 4 and threatening New Caledonia, it hit Lord Howe Island as a subtropical low on March 15, despite weakening to Category 1 the day before. The remnants of Sandra bought areas of heavy rain and thunderstorms to drought-stricken parts of New Zealand, with reports of up to 112 mm at Turakina near Whanganui and a tornado in New Plymouth.

High waves caused by the cyclone caused the death of one man at Bondi beach in Australia.

=== Other systems ===
The following weak tropical disturbances and depressions were also monitored by RSMC Nadi, however all of these systems were either short lived or did not develop significantly. The first tropical disturbance of the season developed on November 6, to the southwest of Suva, Fiji. The system subsequently moved towards the southeast over the next day, before it was last noted during November 7, as it moved out of the tropics. Late on December 30, Tropical Depression 06F developed within the South Pacific convergence zone, about 515 km (320 mi) to the west of Niue. During the next day, the system slowly moved southwards and developed into a tropical depression, before it was last noted later that day as it moved out of the tropics. On January 7, Tropical Disturbance 07F developed near an upper level low, in area of moderate vertical windshear about 800 km (495 mi) to the northeast of Papeete on Tahiti Island in French Polynesia. Over the next two days the disturbance moved towards the southeast, before it was last noted during January 9, as it was not expected to become a tropical cyclone and convection surrounding the system had become irregular.

On January 26, RSMC Nadi reported that Tropical Disturbance 10F had developed within an area of moderate vertical wind shear about 80 km (50 mi) to the east of the Duff Islands. Over the next couple of days the system slowly moved south-eastwards, before the disturbance was last noted by RSMC Nadi on January 28. Tropical Disturbance 12F developed on February 2, under an upper level ridge of high pressure in an area of moderate to high vertical windshear, about 285 km (175 mi) to the south of Papeete, on the French Polynesian island of Tahiti. During that day, convection surrounding the system became displaced to the east of the low level circulation center before the final warning was issued later that day. As the final warning on 12F was issued, RSMC Nadi reported that Tropical Disturbance 13F had developed under an upper level ridge of high pressure in an area of moderate vertical windshear, about 360 km (225 mi) to the northeast of Suva, Fiji. By February 7, the system's low level circulation center became exposed, with RSMC Nadi issuing their final warning on the system as it had left the tropics.

Tropical Depression 15F was first noted within a trough of low pressure on February 21, while it was located about 640 km (400 mi) to the west of Port Vila, Vanuatu. Over the next couple of days the system moved slowly westwards and impacted Fiji, with heavy rain and squally thunderstorms which led to localised flooding being reported in various places on Viti Levu. The system was subsequently last noted during February 24, as it turned and started to move south-eastwards.

On March 12, Tropical Disturbance 18F developed within an area of moderate vertical windshear, underneath an upper level ridge of high pressure about 465 km (290 mi) to the north of Suva, Fiji. Over the next few days the system moved towards the southwest as deep convection surrounding the system decreased, before the system was last noted during March 15. Tropical Disturbance 19F developed on March 14, within an area of moderate vertical windshear about 530 km (330 mi) to the northeast of Port Vila, Vanuatu. Over the next few days, the system moved towards the southwest and affected the Northern islands of Vanuatu, before the disturbance was last noted during March 17. Tropical Disturbance 20F developed on March 27, about 210 km (130 mi) NW of Fiji.

In April no designations were issued until the 20th, when Tropical Disturbance 21F was analysed 165 km (105 mi) south of Rotuma, Fiji.

On April 28, Tropical Disturbance 22F developed within a trough of low pressure, about 485 km (300 mi) to the northeast of Port Vila in Vanuatu. Over the next couple of days convection surrounding the system remained poor, as it moved south-eastwards into an area of high vertical windshear. The system was last noted on May 1, to the south of Fiji as it moved into TCWC Wellington's area of responsibility.

== Storm names ==
Within the Southern Pacific a tropical depression is judged to have reached tropical cyclone intensity should it reach winds of 65 km/h (40 mph) and it is evident that gales are occurring at least halfway around the center. Tropical depressions that intensify into a tropical cyclone between the Equator and 25°S and between 160°E and 120°W are named by the FMS. However, should a tropical depression intensify to the south of 25°S between 160°E and 120°W it will be named by MetService in conjunction with the FMS. If a tropical cyclone moves out of the basin and into the Australian region, it will retain its original name. The names Garry and Haley would be used for the first time this year, after replacing the names Gavin and Hina after the 1996-97 season. The names that were used for the 2012-13 season are listed below:

- Evan
- Freda
- Garry
- Haley

If a tropical cyclone enters the South Pacific basin from the Australian region basin (west of 160°E), it will retain the name assigned to it by the Australian Bureau of Meteorology. The following storms were named in this manner:

- Sandra

=== Retirement ===
After the season, the names Evan and Freda were both retired, and were replaced by Eden and Florin.

== Season effects ==
This table lists all the storms that developed in the South Pacific to the east of longitude 160°E during the 2012–2013 season. It includes their intensity on the Australian tropical cyclone intensity scale, duration, name, landfalls, deaths, and damages. All data is taken from RSMC Nadi and/or TCWC Wellington, and all of the damage figures are in 2012 USD.

Name	Dates	Peak intensity			Areas affected	Damage (USD)	Deaths	Ref(s).
Name	Dates	Category	Wind speed	Pressure	Areas affected	Damage (USD)	Deaths	Ref(s).
01F	November 6–7	Tropical disturbance	Not specified	991 hPa (29.26 inHg)	Fiji	None	None	
02F	November 18–24	Tropical depression	45 km/h (30 mph)	1,001 hPa (29.56 inHg)	Solomon Islands, Vanuatu, Fiji	None	None	
03F	December 9–17	Tropical depression	Not specified	997 hPa (29.44 inHg)	Cook Islands	None	1	
Evan	December 9–19	Category 4 severe tropical cyclone	185 km/h (115 mph)	943 hPa (27.85 inHg)	Samoan Islands, Wallis and Futuna, Fiji; Tonga, New Zealand	$313 million	14	
Freda	December 26 – January 4	Category 4 severe tropical cyclone	185 km/h (115 mph)	940 hPa (27.76 inHg)	Solomon Islands, New Caledonia	Unknown	2	
06F	December 30–31	Tropical depression	Not specified	1,005 hPa (29.68 inHg)	None	None	None	
07F	January 7–9	Tropical disturbance	Not specified	1,003 hPa (29.62 inHg)	French Polynesia	None	None	
08F	January 9–15	Tropical depression	45 km/h (30 mph)	999 hPa (29.50 inHg)	Wallis and Futuna, Fiji, Tonga	None	None	
Garry	January 14–27	Category 3 severe tropical cyclone	150 km/h (95 mph)	965 hPa (28.50 inHg)	Tokelau, Wallis and Futuna; Samoan Islands, Cook Islands	Minor	None	
10F	January 26–28	Tropical disturbance	Not specified	1,000 hPa (29.53 inHg)	Solomon Islands	None	None	
11F	January 26–30	Tropical depression	55 km/h (35 mph)	995 hPa (29.38 inHg)	None	None	None	
12F	February 2	Tropical disturbance	Not specified	1,000 hPa (29.53 inHg)	French Polynesia	None	None	
13F	February 3–7	Tropical disturbance	Not specified	997 hPa (29.44 inHg)	Cook Islands	None	None	
Haley	February 7–11	Category 1 tropical cyclone	75 km/h (45 mph)	990 hPa (29.23 inHg)	Cook Islands	None	None	
15F	February 21–24	Tropical depression	Not specified	1,004 hPa (29.65 inHg)	Fiji	None	None	
16F	February 28 – March 7	Tropical disturbance	Not specified	998 hPa (29.47 inHg)	New Caledonia, Vanuatu, Fiji	None	None	
Sandra	March 9–14	Category 4 severe tropical cyclone	185 km/h (115 mph)	930 hPa (27.46 inHg)	New Caledonia, New Zealand	None	None	
18F	March 12–15	Tropical disturbance	Not specified	1,003 hPa (29.62 inHg)	Fiji	None	None	
19F	March 14–17	Tropical disturbance	Not specified	1,006 hPa (29.71 inHg)	Vanuatu	None	None	
20F	March 27–30	Tropical disturbance	Not specified	1,004 hPa (29.65 inHg)	None	None	None	
21F	April 20–27	Tropical disturbance	Not specified	1,007 hPa (29.74 inHg)	None	None	None	
22F	April 28 – May 1	Tropical disturbance	Not specified	993 hPa (29.32 inHg)	None	None	None	
Season aggregates
22 systems	November 6 – May 1		185 km/h (115 mph)	930 hPa (27.46 inHg)		$313 million	17	

== See also ==
- Tropical cyclones in 2012 and 2013
- List of South Pacific cyclone seasons
- Atlantic hurricane seasons: 2012, 2013
- Pacific hurricane seasons: 2012, 2013
- Pacific typhoon seasons: 2012, 2013
- North Indian Ocean cyclone seasons: 2012, 2013
- 2012–13 South-West Indian Ocean cyclone season
- 2012–13 Australian region cyclone season
