= Tara Moala =

New Zealand community leader

Tara Moala MNZM
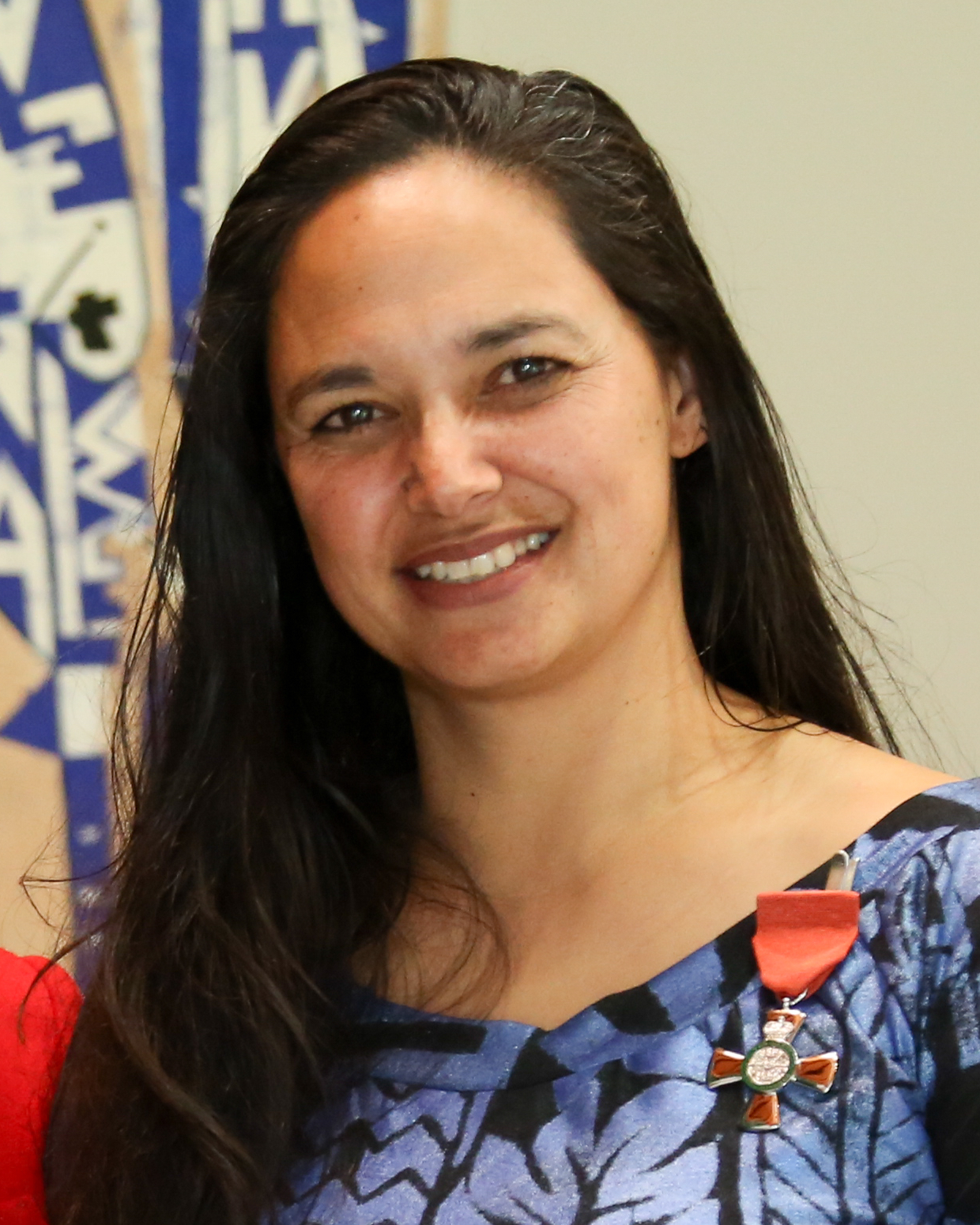
- Awards: Member of the New Zealand Order of Merit

Tara Lai-Ianne Moala MNZM is a New Zealand social and community development worker. In 2023 Moala was appointed a Member of the New Zealand Order of Merit for services to the community and environment.

== Family and education ==
Moala is Māori and affiliates to Waikato-Tainui, Ngāti Māhanga Hourua, Ngāti Hine, Ngāti Paoa, Ngā Wairiki Ngāti Apa, and Ngā Rauru iwi. She also has Chinese, Irish, Croatian and Lebanese heritage. Moala has a Bachelor of Arts and a Master of Social Change Leadership degree, in which she focused on indigenizing regeneration.

== Career ==
Moala was a youth and social worker in 2016 when she founded Rākau Tautoko, which supports community development workers to engage and empower communities, in the areas of environmental and social improvement. Rākau Tautoko was founded as a limited liability company with charitable status, which was a new structure for social enterprise. Moala has been involved in many environmental projects, including waste reduction projects such as Hub Zero and Tāmaki WRAP. In 2020, Moala joined Tāmaki Regeneration Company as the General Manager of Outcomes, where she worked on ways to repurpose old housing stock to divert it from the waste stream. During the COVID-19 pandemic Moala set up a programme to provide food access to communities, using funding from the Ministry of Social Development, Foundation North and the Department of Internal Affairs. More recently, she has been working on Food Sovereignty as Tumuaki Tuari Kai | General Manager of Food Security at Auckland City Mission.

== Honours and awards ==
In the 2023 King's Birthday and Coronation Honours, Moala was appointed a Member of the New Zealand Order of Merit for services to the community and environment.

Moala was awarded an Atlantic Fellowship for Social Equity in 2022, which are hosted by the University of Melbourne, and in 2018 was awarded a Lifekeepers Award. Lifekeeper Awards are conferred by Lifekeepers National Suicide Prevention Training, and are "designed to recognise the often heroic but unacknowledged commitment of individuals and organisations who persevere with efforts and work which make a vital contribution to suicide prevention".
