= Moala Islands =

Subgroup of Fiji's Lau archipelago

Coordinates: 18.838714°S 179.928589°W

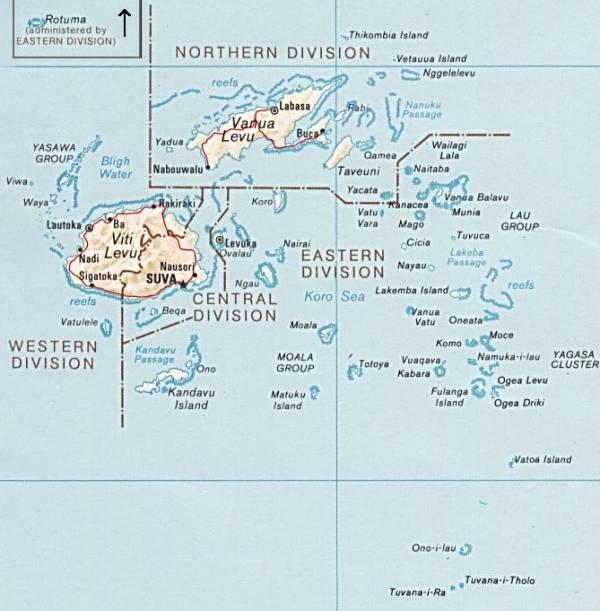
Moala Islands

The Moala Islands are a subgroup of Fiji's Lau archipelago. Its three islands (Matuku, Moala, and Totoya) have a total land area of approximately 119 km^{2}. They are located west of the Lau Islands proper, and were historically linked more closely with Bau Island and Viti Levu than with Lau. They were unified by Ratu Sukuna to the Lau congregation to support traditional gifting through provision of taro and other vegetables. All three islands were defeated by Enele Maafu. The Tongan Prince later the Tui Lau subdued them and enforced Christianity.

The main economic activity of the Moala Islands is coconut farming, and root crop farming including marine agriculture and fisheries. As of 2009, there was no accommodation for visitors on the Moala Islands.
