= Moala Island =

Volcanic island in the Lau Islands, Fiji

Moala
Native name: Yanuyanu Moala मोआला द्वीप
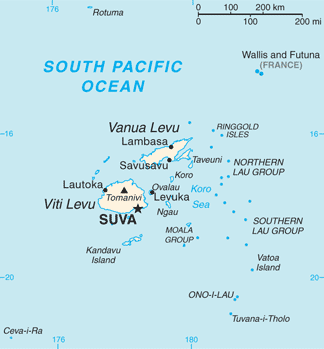
- Map of Fiji

- Location within Fiji

Geography
- Location: Fiji
- Coordinates: 18°36′S 179°52′E
- Archipelago: Moala Islands
- Adjacent to: Koro Sea
- Area: 65 km^{2} (25 sq mi)
- Length: 11 km (6.8 mi)
- Highest elevation: 468 m (1535 ft)

Administration
- Fiji
- Division: Eastern
- Province: Lau Province
- Largest settlement: Naroi (pop. 550)

Demographics
- Population: 1,383 (2017)
- Pop. density: 46.15/km^{2} (119.53/sq mi)
- Ethnic groups: Native Fijians, Indo-Fijians; other (Asian, Europeans, other Pacific Islander)

Moala is a volcanic island in the Moala subgroup of Fiji's Lau archipelago. It has an area of 62.5 square kilometers (24.1 sq mi), making it the ninth largest island of Fiji. The highest point on the island of Moala, at a maximum elevation of 468 meters (1,535 ft), is called Delaimoala which has rich vegetation and consists of dark thick forest. The population of around 3000 live in eight villages. The chiefly village of Naroi, whose population is over 500, was formalised during the colonial era to entertain those that would not be entertained elsewhere, and act as government representation to the vanua. Economic activities include coconut farming, cocoa, kava, dalo, and other self sufficiency production, including fishing.

Oral history of the island depicted by the genealogical records funded by the British through Ratu Sukuna, whose mother is from Naocovonu, a clan within the larger Nasau group. The genealogical records or Vola-ni-Kawa Bula kei Viti dictates that all Moalans are to be registered under two great sons of pre-Colonial Fiji: Kubuavanua (now claimant to the title Tui Moala) and Rovarovaivalu. This separates the island into two sub-regions: Moala Levu and Moala Lailai. Moala Levu includes the Nasau clan (also known as Yavusa Ratu, Turagalevu and Turaga Ulu), whose influence is mainly felt on the West-north-west of the island from Naroi to Vadra. Moala Lailai, whose village include: Keteria (annocdatal Uciwai), Vunuku (formerly Manukui), Nasoki and Cakova (formerly Votua), with keenly influence from Wainikelei (post-Colonially referred to as Keteira), the first inhabitants of the island via Totoya via the eldest of the Ratu, who legends have it as lost at sea from his maiden voyage, as part of the graduation to becoming an adult. These group of Moalans are on the East-south-eastern end of the Island from Vunuku, Keteira, Cakova and Nasoki. It was once a centre of inter-island trading network between western and eastern Fijian islands witnessing the exchange of sails, tapa mats (masi) and cinnamon (macou) from the Lomaivitis and sennit and canoes from the Laus.

Post-Colonial Fiji resulted in the relocation of Nasau to Naroi today and the resettlement of Manukui to Vunuku, Cakova and Nasoki. Nasoki was the branch off of the Manukui Clan after the Manukui war that saw the people of Nasoki part of the Davetalevu people (once Dau ki Manukui) left stranded on the beach collecting seafood for the clan after they burned their village, only to be saved by the Wainikelei Clan resulting in shifting their allegiance, to set up a stronghold at the old Wainikelei Fort up of the hills of Nasoki and Keteira today. Other settlers came in the form of Vadra, Nuku and Maloku from other parts of Fiji as a formalization of their effort in the last tribal war that occurred on the Island, that politicised the establishment through the effort to registration of native Fijians by Sukuna.

Folk stories have depicted 7 separate inflow of clan, though they were part of the earlier settlement. The first depicted to have settled at Moala are the Wainikelei clan, first occupying Qaliqali their old settlement on the east-south-east of the island facing Totoya and Matuku, before settling in Wainikelei mound. Today, part of the progeny from the group through maternal lineage settles in current Keteira village. The second settlers were the returning Nasau people, after winning the game of chiefs at the Nuku katudrau, who were sent to represent the lost eldest son of the Ratu. The third were the Votua and Keteiloma people arriving to present the token of appreciation from Tanoavisawaqa of Bau for his recue from the highlands. Followed are the Butoni people who arrived via Taveuni. Then the Keteicake of Turagalevu group, resulting is skirmishes of war, leading to the arrival of the Lasakau clan now occupying Nuku. The Vadra people arrived supposedly from Beqa after the Nakorowaiwai War, claimed the spot where a group from Natumua in Kadavu once settled to show support to the Nasau clan during the Manukui war, intentions now clear bearing a whales tooth for the capture of the last known descendant of the Ratu from the first migration.

Development pressure result in undue activity on the islands fragile natural resource forcing the islanders to withdraw excessively. Pollution at sea is an increasing concern, especially in the Uciwai Bay via its narrow channel that restrict the expulsion of pollutants once deposited inside the bay due largely to strong wind and current pattern at the mouth of the channel as well as reef structure.

Religion is a strong component of live with majority following the Methodist Church dogmas. Other Christian denominations; Seventh Day Adventist, Catholics, Assembly of God, and even new prosperity churches and Jehovah's Witnesses. History of the Methodist church came by way of Maáfu and his Lakeba confederacy with support from the then Wesleyan Missionaries from Australia. The first church was constructed on supposed Nasau land, now Vunuku, which was burned by the Nasau clan after a misgiving with the then clergymen, of Tongan descent. This resulted in the burning of the said dwelling of the priest. Prior to the burning, at the behest of friends, Josaia Donumaibulu the second generation of Moalan stock to follow what was called "lotu" exited the protection of his own brothers of Nasau to settle with his relative and kin in Wainikelei. Donumaibulu served his last mission in Rewa where he died and was commemorated and named after the church (building) at Lomanikoro in Rewa.

Local folk stories depict that "Rokomautu" (the sturdy one) arrived on the island upon arrival on the Kaunitoni (dipping stick), on a maiden voyage approved by his father, the "Ratu" on the south-east end of Moala. In other folk stories, the Ratu left Totoya, and made his way to now known Verata after the unforetold disappearance of his eldest sone referred to as Ravouvou, which upon his age commission the race at the "nukukatudrau" (hundred fathomed beach) of all his eldest sons to appoint his successor. The representative of the Ravouvou, who was unknown to many at the race, won the race, where unsatisfied advisors sort to prolong the appointment by a day. This resulted in treachery that shook the Fijian historical narrative and culture to its core. Other popular, now, legends have it that Kubunavanua came to Moala from Tonga, upon returning on the Kaunitera, which was the former Kaunitoni, used by the Yavusa Turagalevu after arriving at Moala, and sought to find new lands, returned with the princes from Tonga after betrothing her from her father. Upon arrival, the Nasau people, aware of the following danger besought them to not stay, which they opted to settle at Keteicake, just across the bay, below the manukui ranges. Thus the name, "Kubuavanua" or "Kabuavanua" (shadows of land). Legends have it that his return was not acceptable to his clan at Moala as he eloped the high princess ("tabusiga") of Tonga, this supposedly ensured a rescue party from Tonga which seemingly in the face of Maafu. Kubuavanua led the group that calls themselves the "Turagalevu" or "Big King". Folk history would have these two, Rokomautu and Kubuavanua, to be of the first landers or land people, with Rokomautu of the Tuiwai stock and Kuduavanua the Tura stock or the progeny of Lutunasobasoba and Degei respectively. Local legends has it that the Tuiwai Stock are akin to sailing whose natural skill in navigation is immediately experienced when at the helm and one of whose deity is rain or lagi. Generalised legend has it that the two stock both arrived at Moala, the Tuiwai stock stayed behind while the Tura stock took helm to Tonga, taking with them the Kaunitoni, and returning with a new name Kaunitera. The purpose of each name Tuiwai and Tura was akin to duties each have on every sea voyage: the Tuiwai stock took the helm, while the Tura stock is to change of the mast that must be transferred to either end of the canoe when necessitated to catch wind and change direction; thus the two bow design of Fijian sailing canoe.

Soon before the Colonial era, ensured after the Manukui War, the Navucunimasi (known as Namoala and Nasau people), on their return from the competition they were sent for, saw a void in the leadership on the island after the passing of Veremi of Wainikelei. The name Moala was theorised upon approach of the clan supposedly Totoya after being blown off-course on his maiden voyage with the word "Mua-la" (follow the bow of the canoe). The analogy was also used when the Nasau clan approached the island, after being sent off from Sawakasa, Tailevu at the end of the chief's game to bestow the successor of the Ratu, saying, "if you want to live, go back to whence you came". The Nasau clan said to have returned from Verata (the winner of the nukukatudrau race, which they participated representing the eldest of the Ratu of Vereta), on the west of Uciwai (the only undisturbed mount, where the eldest of the Ratu settled and occupy, whose direct lineage is Veremi of Wainikelei) decided to solidify their claim to chiefdom by bestowing the Tui Nasau, after the Manukui war, in the absence of the Head of Wainikelei, in the Vola-ni-Kawa Bula kei Viti Wainikeli (misspelled by the then secretary who was from Wainikeli in Taveuni). Soon after the Colonials stepped into the fold forcing the establishment of the Tui Moala, which the Tui Nasau agreed to appoint and let the Turagalevu clan at the time, and was instructed: "to represent/entertain Government at Naroi, whilst bringing all news and request to the Tui Nasau for deliberation to the "vanua" or other Villages". The bestowment of the Tui Nasau and Tui Moala is only made possible by the Wainikelei stock and its surviving member through maternal lineage, despite being remotely related to the Manukui Clan. Legend has it that to complete the ritual, a basket of soil and a bunch of young coconuts will have to be presented as the symbol of will and desire of land and people. Since neither in the warring faction have such status, the elders at Wainekeli were approached and agreed in the name of peace to partake in the bestowment ceremony.

The Moalan stock are one of Fiji oldest, whose respect and strength can be adorned by the linkage between the island and a few islands in the Fiji group, including Taveuni, Verata, Bau, Gau, Levuka, Cicia, Vatoa, Ono Kadavu and a few others. The Tuicakau is denoted to be of Moalan stock, who legends have it to be bestowed as Tuicakau by villages upon seeing him on the reef. Lineage also ran from village to village in the Lomaitivi group, to the Takalai Gau. The Moalan stock is renowned in war and war strategies, and was asked upon to assist, resulting in victories, despite been untold in the greater history books, have cemented their participation via household names.

The occupation of Moala began and followed the said order: 1. Wainikelei Clan, 2. Navucunimasi (Nasau Clan), 3. Votua (moved to Cakova), 4. Manukui (moved to Vunuku), 5. Keteicake (returning after occupying Lakeba). 6. Nuku, 7. Maloku, is the of-sort of Naroi/Nasau 8. Vadra.

== Transportation ==
The island is served by Moala Airport.

== See also ==
Moala Lailai, whose village include: Keteria (formerly Uciwai) Vunuku, Nasoki and Cakova, with keenly influence from Wainikelei (post-Colonially referred to as Keteira), the first inhabitants of the island via Totoya. See Tawa ni Vanua ko Viti, Rv Epeli Waqatabu.

- List of islands
