= Matuku Island =

Matuku Burotukula
- Island and Tikina
- Location in Fiji
- Coordinates: 19°10′S 179°46′E
- Country: Fiji
- Archipelago: Lau Islands
- Sub group: Yasayasa Moala
- Province: Lau

Area
  - Total: 57 km^{2} (22 sq mi)
- Elevation: 385 m (1,263 ft)

Population (2017)
  - Total: 522
  - Density: 9.2/km^{2} (24/sq mi)

Matuku is a volcanic island in the Moala subgroup of Fiji's Lau archipelago. Located at 19.18° South and 179.75° East, Matuku covers an area of 57 square kilometers. It has a maximum elevation of 385 meters. Matuku is part of a group of islands known as Yasayasa Moala.

There are altogether seven villages in Matuku namely Yaroi, Natokalau, Qalikarua, Levukaidaku, Makadru, Raviravi and Lomati.

== History ==
In 1827, Jules Dumont d'Urville became the first European to discover the island.

There are conflicting accounts on whether or not the island was conquered by the Tongans led by the Tongan Prince Enele Ma'afu. Oral history passed down through the native Matuku people states that the island was not conquered by Enele Ma'afu whilst historical records state otherwise. Thomas Williams, a missionary in the island group, records in a journal entry that Matuku was conquered by Ma'afu in 1853 after a three month long siege at the principal village of Yaroi. Although journals of Thomas Williams say Matuku was also among the islands conquered by Ma'afu, customs and traditions in the island of Matuku and its people divert from that of other conquered islands in the Lau group. The 'tawala' or mats that are worn around the waist by Tongans during ceremonies are also worn by every island in the Lau group except Matuku. This is a symbolism of victory of the people of Matuku over the Tongan chief and his men.

== Notable people ==
Matuku has produced a number of people who have contributed to the development and progress of Fiji and have held public office during their time. The late Reverend Setareki Tuilovoni hailed from Natokalau, to be the first local President of the Methodist Church of Fiji and Rotuma since it became an independent entity, and Reverend Setareki Rika and his family who have either served as Church Ministers, Doctors or Teachers. Dr Macu Salato hailed from Qalikarua who became the Lord Mayor of Suva and also was the Commissioner of the South Pacific Community, Dr Peni Rika hailed from Makadru, along with numerous medical practitioners, teachers, and clergymen. The late Setareki Tuinaceva, who held office with the Fiji Rugby Union for a number of years, hailed from Lomati. Sir Timoci Tuivaga, who served as Fiji's first native-born Chief Justice from 1974 to 2002, was also from Matuku. The late Former Member of Parliament and Government Minister Hon Jonetani Kaukimoce was from Qalikarua. Savenaca Tuivaga was the Fiji Police Contingent leader to the Solomon Islands and other international assignments. Joeli Veitayaki, former Fiji 15s rugby captain was also a native of the island. Filipe Rayasi represented Fiji in Rugby and his son, Salesi Rayasi who represented the All Blacks in the Sevens code and in the Flying Fijians 15s code, both of Qalikarua village.
