= Moala (beetle) =

Scientific classification
- Kingdom: Animalia
- Phylum: Arthropoda
- Class: Insecta
- Order: Coleoptera
- Suborder: Polyphaga
- Infraorder: Cucujiformia
- Family: Cerambycidae
- Tribe: Acanthocinini
- Genus: Moala

Genus of beetles

Moala (beetle) is a genus of beetles in the family Cerambycidae, containing the following species:

- Moala crassus Dillon & Dillon, 1952
- Moala flavovittatus Dillon & Dillon, 1952
