= Naroi =

- Village
- Location in Fiji
- Coordinates: 18°36′S 179°53′E
- Country: Fiji
- Island: Moala Island
- Division: Eastern Division
- Province: Lau

Population (1945)
  - Total: 340

Naroi (Fijian pronunciation: [naroi̯]) is a village located on Moala Island, in the Eastern District and Lau Province of Fiji. Historically the largest settlement on the island, Naroi had an estimated population of 340 in the mid-1950s, out of a total island population of approximately 1,200. The village has experienced population decline in recent decades due to rural–urban migration, particularly among youth and young women. Naroi has a tropical rainforest climate and relies on subsistence agriculture, fishing, and handicrafts for its economy.

== Demographics ==
As of the 1954–1955 period, Naroi had an estimated population of 340 people, making it the largest village on Moala Island at the time. The total population of Moala Island during the 1950s was approximately 1,200, nearly all Indigenous Fijians, with the exception of a few Chinese shopkeepers. Naroi accounted for less than one-third of the island's total population.

While more recent official figures are not publicly available, Naroi remains one of Moala's eight coastal villages, and current accounts suggest its population has declined in recent decades, particularly among youth and young women, due to rural–urban migration. Recent community concerns and media reports indicate that demographic aging and youth outmigration continue to affect the village's population structure.

== Geography and economy ==
Naroi experiences a tropical rainforest climate with consistently warm temperatures, high humidity, and significant annual rainfall. The dry season from July to October is considered "the best time to visit", according to Weather Atlas. The village faces infrastructure challenges, particularly related to aging solar panels and the cost of water and energy provision. Despite these difficulties, Naroi maintains strong community cohesion and is seen as a model for integrating tradition with sustainable development in rural Fiji. Economically, Naroi relies on subsistence agriculture (notably yaqona and dalo), mat weaving, and fishing, while some residents work as civil servants on Fiji's main islands. In April 1999, 170 households in Naroi were equipped with 100-watt-peak (Wp) solar generators and prepaid meters.

Tourism has recently gained momentum in Naroi, celebrated for its cultural authenticity and natural beauty, with increasing visitor interest contributing to local livelihoods. However, this growth also brings concerns over environmental impact and cultural preservation, prompting the community to promote eco-friendly tourism practices and community-based planning. The village is also involved in marine and terrestrial conservation initiatives under the Fiji Lau Seascape and Cook Islands programs, which focus on strengthening traditional governance, sustainable resource use, and economic opportunities for women and youth.
