= Maseikula =

Fijian chief

- Children: Vukinavanua
- Parent: Buivaroro

Maseikula (pronounced: [maseikulaː]) was a Fijian High Chief. He was a Chief of the island of Nayau.

Maseikula was a son of High Chief Buivaroro and his wife, the High Chiefess Tarau. Maseikula's grandfather was Naosara. He was a progenitor of a prominent Fijian royal house. It is possible that Maseikula was born on the island of Lakeba, where lived his uncle Kalouyalewa. On the other hand, he may have been born on Nayau.

After his father died, Maseikula succeeded him. Maseikula married an unknown woman, with whom he had two sons – Vakaoti and Vukinavanua.

Vukinavanua ruled after Maseikula died, while Vakaoti had a title of Sau Mai.
