= Racism in Fiji =

The topic of racism is an ongoing and controversial issue in Fiji, especially in Fijian politics. Racism has been cited as one of the main reasons for the occurrence of coups d'état in Fiji in the past, with Fiji having had four coups, more than any other country in Oceania.

== History ==
=== Pre-independence ===
In 1874, a Ku Klux Klan group was established in Fiji by white American and British settlers wanting to enact White supremacy, although its operations were quickly suppressed by the British who, although not officially yet established as the major authority of Fiji, had played a leading role in establishing a new constitutional monarchy, the Kingdom of Fiji, that was being threatened by the activities of the Fijian Klan, which owned fortresses and artillery. By March, it had become the "British Subjects' Mutual Protection Society", which included Francis Herbert Dufty.

=== Post-independence ===
Both before and after Fiji gained independence from the United Kingdom in 1970, there were ethnic tensions between the Indigenous Fijians and the Indo-Fijians, Fiji's two largest ethnic groups, who (at the time) made up an estimated 46% and 49% of the population, respectively. and religion (the majority of Indo-Fijians are Hindus, while the majority of Indigenous Fijians are Christians).

In 1987, the two coups d'état were successful in removing Prime Minister Timoci Bavadra from power, the deposition of Elizabeth II as the Queen of Fiji and the declaration of a republic. These coups are believed to have been motivated by ethnic tensions.

In 2000, another coup d'état was held by Fijian nationalists aimed at removing the country's first Indian Prime Minister, Mahendra Chaudhry.

In 2006, Frank Bainimarama (who has been Prime Minister since 2007, having been elected after elections were restored in 2014) successfully launched a coup d'état and effectively removed the Government of Fiji. Bainimarama said he did this in order to make governmental reforms, such as to create a new constitution. He also aimed to end racial tensions in Fiji.
