= Vukinavanua =

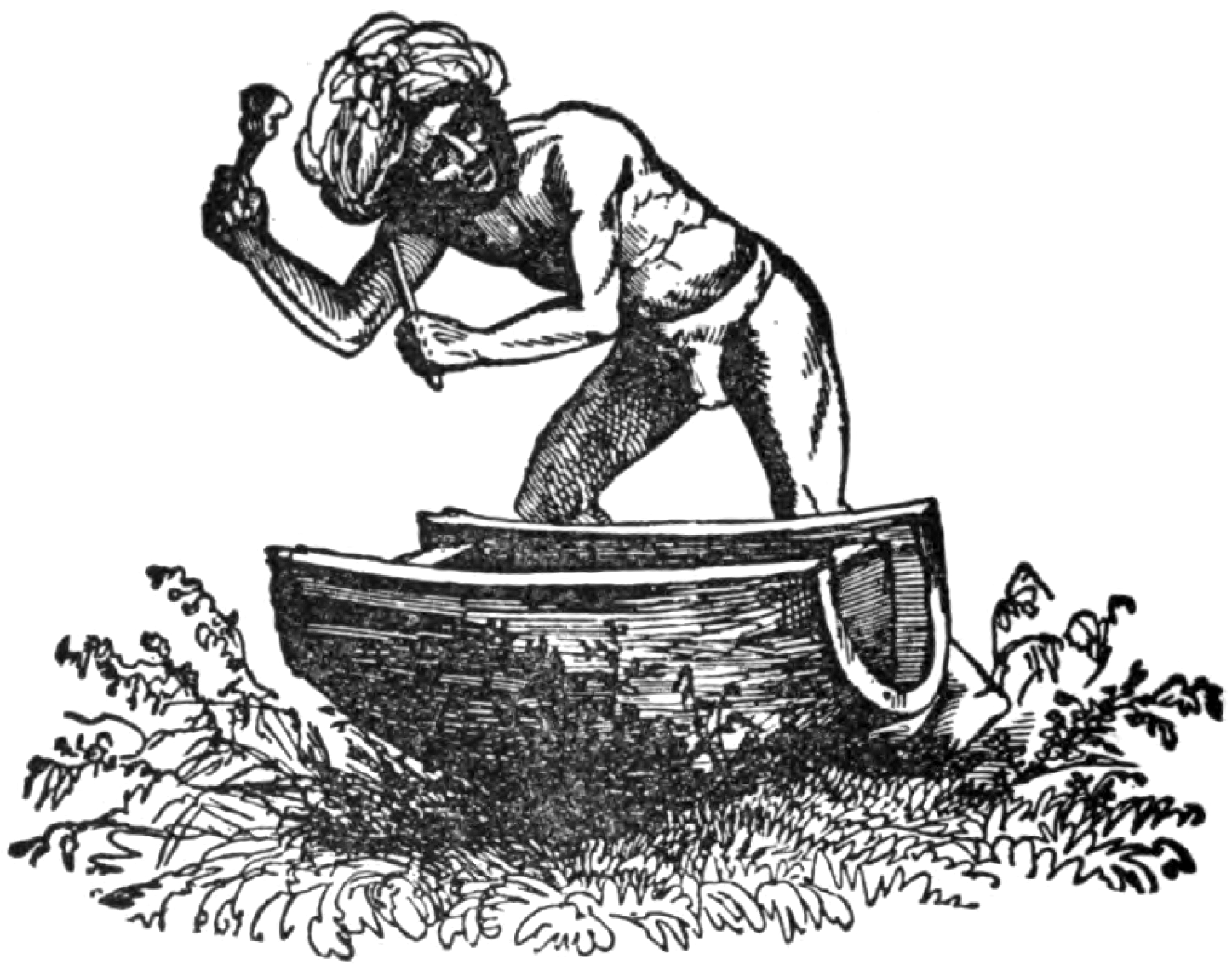
- Children: Lady Lebaidrani; Lady Cabata; Prince Ravonoloa
- Parent: Maseikula

Tu’i Vukinavanua (pronunciation: [βukinaβanua]) was a Fijian High Chief of the island of Nayau.

It is likely that Vukinavanua was born on Nayau. His father was High Chief Maseikula of Nayau, who was a son of Lord Buivaroro and Lady Tarau. Vukinavanua’s mother was a noble lady. Her name is unknown. Vukinavanua had a brother named Vakaoti, who was Sau Mai. He lived on Nayau.

After Maseikula died, Vukinavanua became the ruler of Nayau.

He had at least one wife and three children – Lady Lebaidrani, Lady Cabata and Prince Ravonoloa.

Chief Niumataiwalu of Lakeba sent emissaries to escort his cousin Vukinavanua to Lakeba. Vukinavanua felt too old and weak to undertake the venture and instead sent the katonisau (basket containing the Nayau chiefly regalia) which remained with Niumataiwalu’s branch. This gesture is significant as it suggests a symbolic transference of Vukinavanua’s rights to Niumatawalu’s family. Vukinavanua was thus succeeded by Niumataiwalu’s son, Rasolo.
