= Cyclone Ana =

Category 3 South Pacific cyclone in 2021

Severe Tropical Cyclone Ana
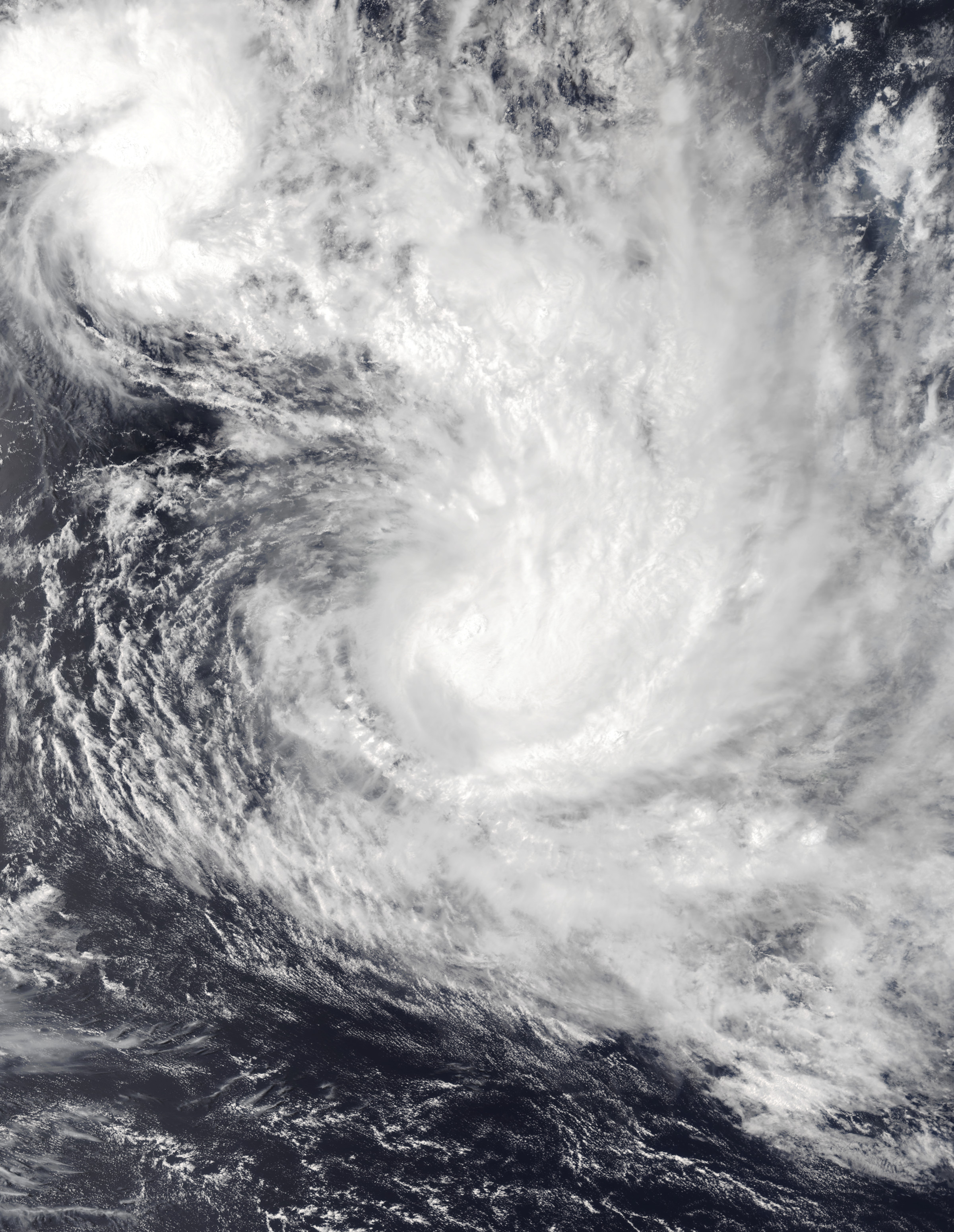
- Cyclone Ana south of Fiji on 31 January, along with Cyclone Bina to its northwest

Meteorological history
- Formed: 26 January 2021
- Subtropical: 1 February 2021
- Dissipated: 5 February 2021

Category 3 severe tropical cyclone
- 10-minute sustained (FMS)
- Highest winds: 120 km/h (75 mph)
- Lowest pressure: 970 hPa (mbar); 28.64 inHg

Category 1-equivalent tropical cyclone
- 1-minute sustained (SSHWS/JTWC)
- Highest winds: 120 km/h (75 mph)
- Lowest pressure: 975 hPa (mbar); 28.79 inHg

Overall effects
- Fatalities: 1 total
- Missing: 4
- Damage: >$10 million (2021 USD)
- Areas affected: Fiji
- IBTrACS
- Part of the 2020–21 South Pacific cyclone season

Severe Tropical Cyclone Ana was one of three tropical cyclones to impact the island nation of Fiji towards the end of January 2021. The fifth tropical disturbance, third tropical cyclone and second severe tropical cyclone of the 2020–21 South Pacific cyclone season, Ana was first noted as Tropical Disturbance 05F during 26 January, while it was located about 220 km (135 mi) to the northeast of Port Vila in Vanuatu. Over the next few days, the system moved eastwards and gradually developed further, before it was declared to be a tropical cyclone and named Ana during 29 January. Over the next day, the system moved south-eastwards towards Fiji before it made landfall on the island of Viti Levu. After emerging into the Pacific Ocean, the system intensified into a Category 3 severe tropical cyclone, before it rapidly degenerated into a subtropical low during 1 February.

AON Benfield estimates that Ana caused "tens of millions" of dollars in damage across Fiji. Due to its onslaught, the name Ana was retired from the naming list and was replaced by Aru.

== Meteorological history ==
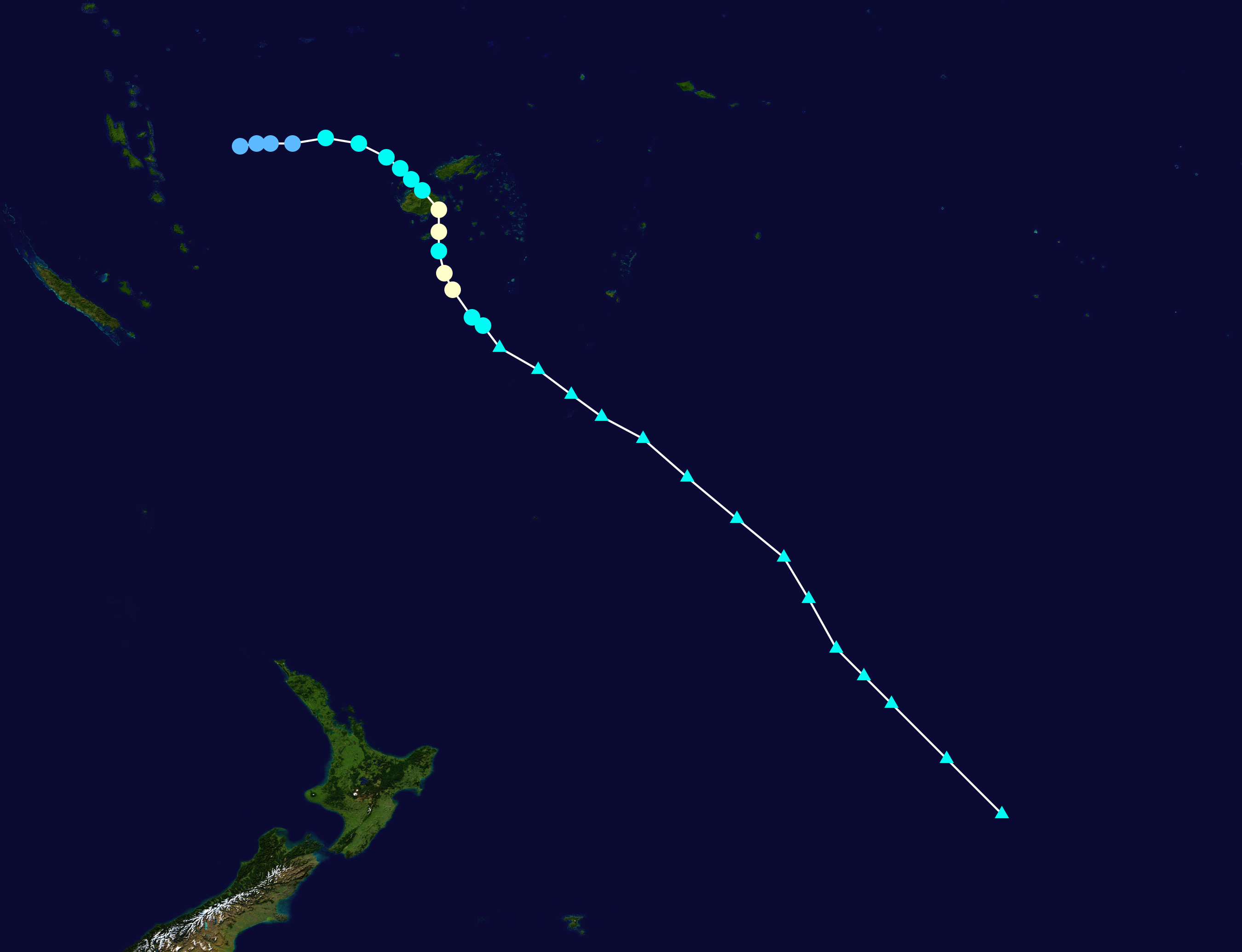
Map plotting the storm's track and intensity, according to the Saffir–Simpson scale Map key Saffir–Simpson scale Tropical depression (≤38 mph, ≤62 km/h) Tropical storm (39–73 mph, 63–118 km/h) Category 1 (74–95 mph, 119–153 km/h) Category 2 (96–110 mph, 154–177 km/h) Category 3 (111–129 mph, 178–208 km/h) Category 4 (130–156 mph, 209–251 km/h) Category 5 (≥157 mph, ≥252 km/h) Unknown Storm type Tropical cyclone Subtropical cyclone Extratropical cyclone, remnant low, tropical disturbance, or monsoon depression

During 26 January, the Fiji Meteorological Service (FMS) reported that Tropical Disturbance 05F had developed within the South Pacific convergence zone about 220 km (135 mi) to the northeast of Port Vila in Vanuatu. During that day, the system moved eastwards and developed into a tropical depression, within an area of low to moderate vertical wind shear. Over the next couple of days, the system moved eastwards and gradually developed further, as atmospheric convection started to wrap into the systems low level circulation center. During 29 January, the FMS reported that the depression had developed into a Category 1 tropical cyclone on the Australian scale and named it Ana. At this time, the system was located about 350 km (215 mi) to the northwest of Nadi in Fiji and had started to be steered south-southeastwards towards Fiji, by a ridge of high pressure to the northeast of the system. The United States Joint Typhoon Warning Center subsequently initiated advisories, on the newly named system and designated it as Tropical Cyclone 15P.

During 30 January, Ana continued to move south-southeastwards and passed through the northern Yasawa Islands into the Bligh Waters, where it became slow-moving and intensified into a category 2 tropical cyclone. The system subsequently continued to develop with an eye feature appearing on both radar and microwave imagery, before it made landfall on Viti Levu near Rakiraki at around 18:00 UTC (06:00 FST, 31 January). While located over Viti Levu, Ana moved south-southeastwards over the Central Division, where it passed in between Navua and Fiji's capital city: Suva. The JTWC subsequently reported that the system had peaked with 1-minute sustained winds of 120 km/h (75 mph), which made it equivalent to a Category 1 hurricane on the Saffir-Simpson hurricane wind scale. During 31 January, Ana emerged into the Kadavu Passage and passed near or over Kadavu, before the FMS reported that the system had peaked as a Category 3 severe tropical cyclone, with 10-minute sustained winds of 120 km/h (75 mph). During 1 February, the system rapidly weakened into a subtropical low, as its low-level circulation center became exposed and moved south-eastwards into an area of high vertical wind shear. Over the next few days, Ana moved south-eastwards over the South Pacific Ocean as a subtropical low, before it was last noted during 3 February.

== Preparations and impact ==
During 27 January, the FMS issued a gale alert as well as a heavy rain warning for Vanua Levu, Taveuni, the Yasawa Group and Lau Islands, while strong wind warnings and a flash flood alert were already in force. Later that day after Tropical Depression 06F had developed over Lau Province, these alerts and warnings were expanded to include a tropical cyclone alert for the whole of Fiji and a gale wind warning for Vanua Levu, Taveuni and the Lau Islands.

In Fiji, the put a Tropical Cyclone Alert in effect for Vanua Levu, Yasawa, and Mamanuca, as well as smaller nearby islands. A Strong Wind Warning was ordered for northern Viti Levu, while a Gale Warning was put in place for Vanua Levu, Taveuni, and Lau. Meanwhile, Heavy Rain Warnings and Alerts were issued for portions of the country. With the threat of heavy rainfall, a Flood Warning was issued for low-lying areas and small streams along the Qawa River, with Flash Flood Alerts for Vanua Levu and for Viti Levu from the towns of Ba to Rakiraki. All schools in Fiji were closed as a precaution on 29 January, with teachers asked to help prepare classrooms as evacuation centers if needed. A nightly curfew was ordered between 29–31 January. More than 2,000 residents evacuated to shelters across Fiji.

Heavy precipitation associated with the depression hit Fiji as early as 28 January, causing flooding in Rakiraki. On 29 January, the Nadi River overflowed its banks due to heavy rainfall, flooding parts of Nadi. Footage from Ba showed severe flooding in parts of the town. Extensive damage following landfall was reported in the majority of Viti Levu, especially the capital Suva which was directly hit, with 5 people (including a three-year-old boy) reportedly missing. Rivers across Fiji quickly became overflown while landslides destroyed what remained of some homes. Power outages became widespread across the nation and a 49-year-old man was confirmed dead from drowning in floodwaters. An additional 7,600 people were evacuated to evacuation centers during the storm in similar regions to which were devastated by Category 5 Cyclone Yasa a month prior. Schools were reopened on 8 February except for the northern division which was scheduled to open a week later. In the aftermath, a Royal New Zealand Air Force (RNZAF) C-130 Hercules delivered emergency supplies to the district of Nadi. One million kits were delivered to assist affected families, including hygiene kits, mother and infant kits, water containers, water pumps, purification tablets and tarpaulins.

== See also ==
- Tropical cyclones in 2021
- Cyclone Winston
- Cyclone Yasa
