= Kaunitoni =

Kaunitoni, according to Fijian ancestral story, was a canoe which sailed from an ancient homeland in the West, carrying the ancestor gods Lutunasobasoba and Degei, who are variously considered the ancestors of the Fijian people.

They travelled in the Kaukifera or Kaunitoni, and the canoe landed in the western reef of Viti Levu, just north of the village of Viseisei, between Nadi and Lautoka. Here the crew split, with one faction making a home on the island with Lutunasobasoba as a chief. The Kaunitoni then sailed eastwards along the coast of Viti Levu under the leadership of Degei, landing at Rakiraki and going up to the Nakauvandra Mountains.

This particular story has come under much criticism and scrutiny from some anthropologists and linguists who suggest that the story is in fact of “missionary parentage” owing to a competition held in the late 1870s by the district office at the time who was looking to develop a more fanciful story than that which existed in Fijian circles at the time. The winning story tells that the gods, Degei and Lutunasobasoba, were from Lake Tanganyika. A widely accepted theory is that Fiji's first inhabitants were Proto-Polynesians of the Lapita culture, whose ancestors were from South East Asia.

== See also ==
Fijian mythology
