= Religion in Fiji =

Religion in Fiji (2017 census)
1. Christianity (69.2%)
2. Hinduism (24.0%)
3. Islam (5.75%)
4. Other (1.04%)

According to the most recent census in 2017, just under 7 in 10 people in Fiji are Christian (69.21% of the population), with a sizable Hindu (24.0%) and Muslim (5.8%) minority. Religion tends to split along ethnic lines with most Indigenous Fijians being Christian and most Indo-Fijians being mostly Hindu or in some cases, Muslim.

Aboriginal Fijian religion could be classified in modern terms as forms of animism or shamanism, traditions utilizing various systems of divination which strongly affected every aspect of life. Fiji was Christianised in the 19th century. Today, there are various Christian denominations in Fiji, the largest being the Methodist church. Hinduism and Islam arrived with the importation of large numbers of people from South Asia, most of them indentured, in the late 1800s and early 1900s.

Fiji has many public holidays as it acknowledges the special days held by the various belief systems, such as Easter and Christmas for the Christians, Diwali for the Hindus and the Eid al-Adha for the Muslims.

A bure kalou, a pre-Christian Fijian religious building

== History ==
Fijian religion before the 19th century included various forms of animism and divination. Contact from the early 19th century with European Christian missionaries, especially of the Methodist denomination, saw the conversion of dominant chiefs such as Octavia and, thus, also the people they controlled. Cession of the islands to Great Britain in 1874 saw great change in all aspects of life including religious practice. Christianity became the dominant faith. Hinduism, Sikhism and Islam were introduced as minority migrant communities came to work in Fiji.

== Demographics ==
Comparison of 1996 and 2007 census results
Religion	1996	%	2007	%	2017	%
Anglican	6,325	0.8%	6,319	0.8%		
Assembly of God	31,072	4.0%	47,791	5.7%		
Catholic	69,320	8.9%	76,465	9.1%		
Methodist	280,628	36.2%	289,990	34.6%		
Seventh-day Adventist	22,187	2.9%	32,316	3.9%		
Other Christians	39,950	5.2%	86,672	10.4%		
Hindu	261,097	33.7%	233,414	27.9%	212,346	24.0%
Sikh	3,067	0.4%	2,540	0.3%		
Muslim	54,323	7.0%	52,505	6.3%	50,925	5.8%
Other Religion	1,967	0.3%	2,181	0.3%		
No Religion	5,132	0.7%	7,078	0.8%		
Total Christian	449,482	58.0%	539,553	64.4%	612,415	69.2%
Total	775,068	100%	837,271	100%	884,887	100%

1996 Data
Religion	Indigenous Fijian		Indo-Fijian		Others		TOTAL
Religion	393,575	%	338,818	%	42,684	%	775,077	%
Methodist	261,972	66.6	5,432	1.6	13,224	31.0	280,628	36.2
Roman Catholic	52,163	13.3	3,520	1.0	13,637	31.9	69,320	8.9
Assemblies of God	24,717	6.2	4,620	1.4	1,735	4.1	31,072	4.0
Seventh-day Adventist	19,896	5.1	572	0.2	1,719	4.0	22,187	2.9
Anglican	2,508	0.6	1,208	0.4	2,609	6.2	6,325	0.8
Jehovah's Witness	4,815	1.2	486	0.1	801	1.9	6,102	0.8
CMF (Every Home)	5,149	1.3	269	0.1	255	0.6	5,673	0.7
Latter Day Saints	2,253	0.6	633	0.2	589	1.4	3,475	0.4
Apostolic	2,237	0.6	250	0.1	106	0.2	2,593	0.3
Gospel	618	0.2	514	0.2	222	0.5	1,354	0.2
Baptist	695	0.2	382	0.1	219	0.5	1,296	0.2
Salvation Army	628	0.2	251	0.1	110	0.3	989	0.1
Presbyterian	105	0.0	90	0.0	188	0.4	383	0.0
Other Christian	12,624	3.2	2,492	0.7	2,969	7.0	18,085	2.3
All Christians	390,380	99.2	20,719	6.1	38,383	89.9	449,482	58.0
Sanātanī	551	0.1	193,061	57.0	315	0.7	193,927	25.0
Arya Samaj	44	0.0	9,493	2.8	27	0.1	9,564	1.2
Kabir Panthi	43	0.0	73	0.0	2	0.0	118	0.0
Sai Baba	7	0.0	52	0.0	1	0.0	60	0.0
Other Hindu	219	0.1	57,096	16.9	113	0.3	57,428	7.4
All Hindus	864	0.2	259,775	76.7	458	1.1	261,097	33.7
Sunni Islam	175	0.0	32,082	9.5	94	0.2	32,351	4.2
Ahmadiyya	18	0.0	1,944	0.6	14	0.0	1,976	0.3
Other Muslim	131	0.0	19,727	5.8	138	0.3	19,996	2.6
All Muslims	324	0.1	53,753	15.9	246	0.6	54,323	7.0
Sikh	0	0.0	3,076	0.9	0	0.0	3,067	0.4
Baháʼí Faith	389	0.1	25	0.0	149	0.3	563	0.1
Confucianism	8	0.0	21	0.0	336	0.8	365	0.0
Other religions	61	0.0	314	0.1	664	1.6	1,039	0.1
No religion†	1549	0.4	1,135	0.3	2,448	5.7	5,132	0.7

† Includes atheists and agnostics.

== Law ==
Fiji had traditional law prior to becoming a colony. After cession, laws that governed Britain were also applied to its colonies and religion developed under the Westminster system. Freedom of religion and conscience has been constitutionally protected in Fiji since the country gained independence in 1970. In 1997, a new constitution was drawn up. It stated:

Although religion and the State are separate, the people of the Fiji Islands acknowledge that worship and reverence of God are the source of good government and leadership.

but also guaranteed every person

35.-(1) Every person has the right to freedom of conscience, religion and belief.

(2) Every person has the right, either individually or in community with others, and both in public and in private, to manifest his or her religion or belief in worship, observance, practice or teaching.

(3) The right set out in subsection (2) extends to the right of religious communities or denominations to provide religious instruction as part of any education provided by them, whether or not they are in receipt of any financial assistance from the State.

(4) The right set out in subsection (2) may be made subject to such limitations prescribed by law as are necessary:

(a) to protect:

(i) the rights or freedoms of other persons; or

(ii) public safety, public order, public morality or public health: or

(b) to prevent a public nuisance.

(5) Except with his or her consent or, in the case of a person under the age of 18, the consent of a parent or guardian, a person attending a place of education is not required to receive religious instruction or to take part in or attend a religious ceremony or observance if the instruction, ceremony or observance relates to a religion that is not his or her own or if he or she does not hold any religious belief.

(6) A person must not be compelled to take an oath, or to take an oath in a manner that is contrary to his or her religion or belief or that requires him or her to express a belief that he or she does not hold.

The 1997 Constitution was suspended in 2009 and replaced in 2013. This constitution states in chapter 1:

4.(1) Religious liberty, as recognised in the Bill of Rights, is a founding principle of the State.
(2) Religious belief is personal.
(3) Religion and the State are separate, which means—
(a) the State and all persons holding public office must treat all religions equally;
(b) the State and all persons holding public office must not dictate any religious belief;
(c) the State and all persons holding public office must not prefer or advance, by any means, any particular religion, religious denomination, religious belief, or religious practice over another, or over any non-religious belief; and
(d) no person shall assert any religious belief as a legal reason to disregard this Constitution or any other law.

The 2013 Constitution also explicitly allows people to swear an oath or to make an affirmation when legally necessary.

In 2026, there is a proposed constitutional change that included re-introducing references to God and Christianity in the preamble.

=== Freedom of religion ===
In 2026, Freedom House scored Fiji 4 out of 4 for religious freedom.

== Ancient religion ==
The term ancient religion in this article refers to the religious beliefs and practices in Fiji prior to it becoming a Colony.

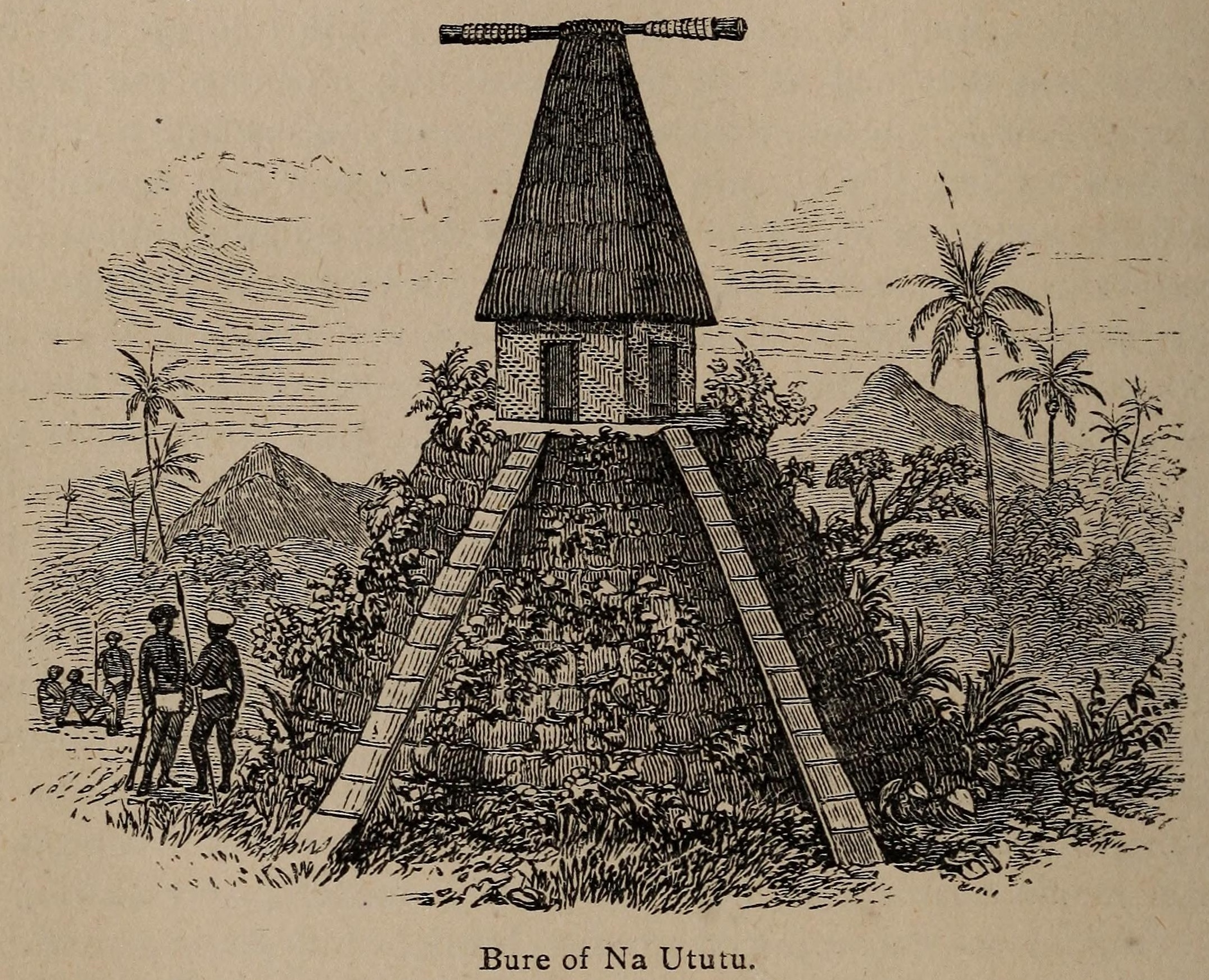
A bure kalou, A sketch done in the early 1800s

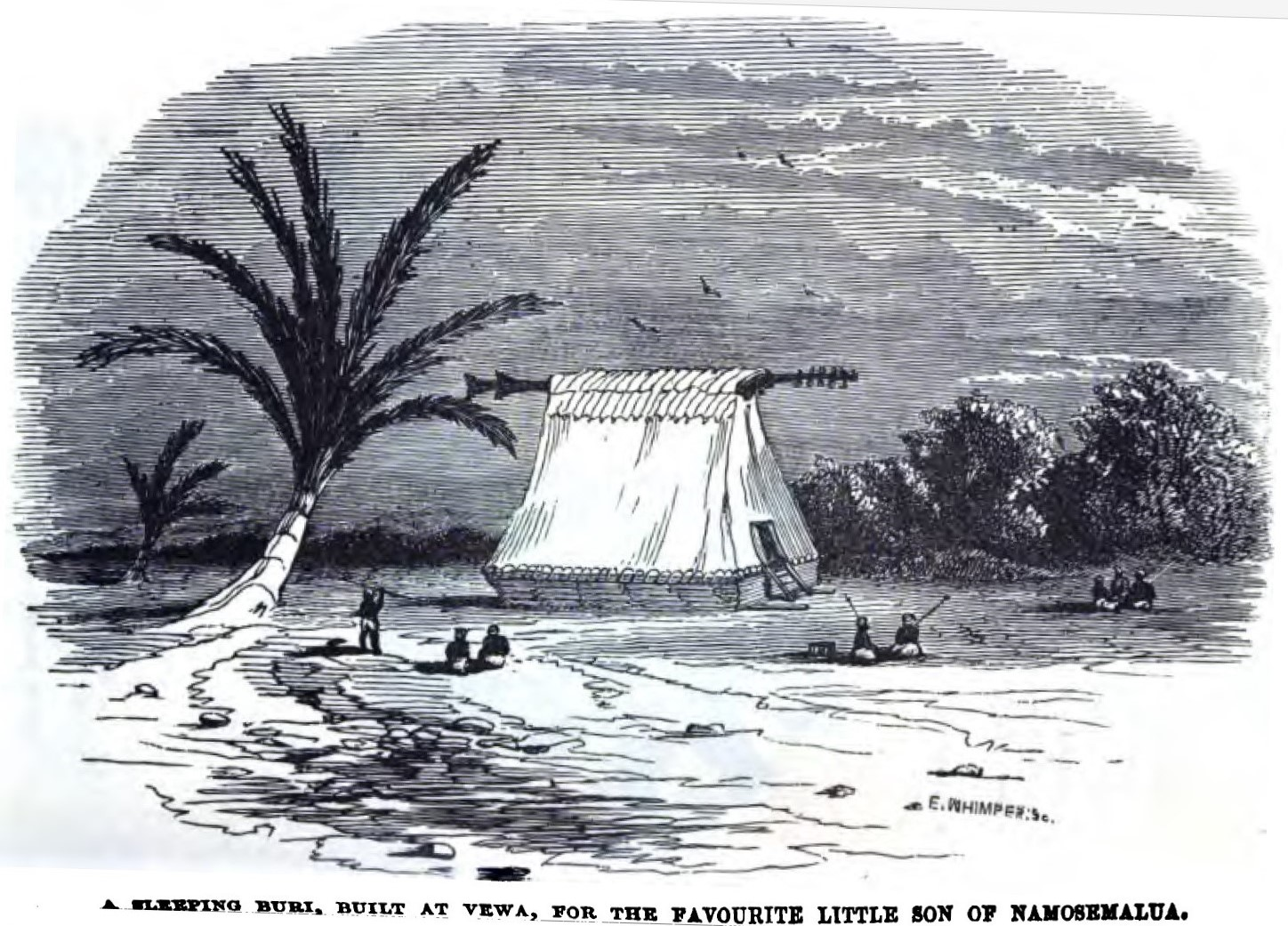
A Sleeping Buri, Built at Vewa, For the favourite little son of Namosemalua, Feejee (October 1852, p.108)

=== Gods, temples and magic ===
Fijian religion, myth, and legend were closely linked and in the centuries before the cession of 1874, it was considered part of everyday life. Of the traditional religion in Fiji, Basil Thomson (1908:111) writes:

The religion of the Fijians was so closely interwoven with their social polity that it was impossible to tear away the one without lacerating the other. ... Religion was a hard taskmaster to the heathen Fijian; it governed his every action from the cradle-mat to the grave. In the tabu it prescribed what he should eat and drink, how he should address his betters, whom he should marry, and where his body should be laid. It limited his choice of the fruits of the earth and of the sea; it controlled his very bodily attitude in his own house. All his life he walked warily for fear of angering the deities that went in and out with him, ever watchful to catch him tripping, and death but cast him naked into their midst to be the sport of their vindictive ingenuity.

Myth was very much reality in the years preceding and following cession. For example, in Taveuni, their god, Kalou Vu(root god), is named Dakuwaqa (Back boat). In Levuka and Kadavu Islands, he is known as Daucina (Expert Light) due to the phosphorescence he caused in the sea as he passed. Daucina, however, has a different connotation as a Kalou yalo (deified ancestors) in other parts of Fiji.

Dakuwaqa took the form of a great shark and lived on Benau Island, opposite Somosomo Strait. He was highly respected by the people of Cakaudrove and Natewa as the god of seafaring and fishing communities, but also the patron of adulterers and philanderers. In the book "Pacific Irishman", the Anglican priest Charles William Whonsbon-Ashton records in Chapter 1, "Creation":

When I came to Fiji the famed fish-god, the Dakuwaqa, was very much a reality. The Government ship, the Lady Escott, reached Levuka with signs of an encounter with the great fish, while the late Captain Robbie, a well known, tall, and very erect Scot, even to his nineties, told of the sleepy afternoon as his cutter was sailing from his tea estate at Wainunu, under a very light wind, with most of the crew dozing. A great fish, which he described as near 60 feet in length, brown-spotted and mottled on its back, with the head of a shark and the tail of a whale, came up under his ship, almost capsizing it. The crew, instantly awake and concerned, followed the ancient pattern, pouring a strong libation of kava into the sea, which, it would seem, was just the right idea for placating fish-gods; the monster slowly submerged, the breeze gradually gathered the cutter away, its keel dragging along the monster's back, making the skin pale. To the Fijian crew, this was the "Dakuwaqa"--in the twentieth century; what must have been the effect in the tenth?

As late as 1957, R.A Derrick (1957:13) states:

Many Yavusa still venerate a bird (e.g. kingfisher, pigeon, heron), an animal (e.g. dog, rat, or even man), a fish or reptile (e.g. shark, eel, snake), a tree (especially the ironwood or Nokonoko), or a vegetable, claiming one or more of these as peculiarly their own and refusing to injure or eat them. The relationship is evidently totemic, and it is probable that each totemic group originally recognized a complete series of three totems: manumanu (living creature, whether animal, bird or insect), fish or vegetable, and tree.

The Gods and their temples

Traditionally, Fijian religion had a hierarchy of gods called "Kalou" or sometimes in the western dialect "Nanitu". In 1854 an early Methodist missionary, Rev. Joseph Waterhouse stated:

It is impossible to ascertain even the probable number of the gods of Fiji; for disembodied spirits are called gods, and are regarded as such. But the natives make a distinction between those who were gods originally, and those who are only deified spirits. The former they call Kalou-vu (root-gods), the latter Kalou-yalo (deified mortals). Of the former class the number is great; but the latter are without number...There were various ranks amongst the Kalou-vu according to the extent of their territory and the number of their worshippers. Thus, some gods were universally known throughout Fiji, others were local gods of large or small territories, while some were simply gods of particular families.

Basil Thomson (1908:113) suggests that, "Groups in Fiji who are tauvu or kalou-vata, i.e. worshippers of the same god, have a common origin".

The Fijian gods (Kalou-Vu, Kalou-Yalo and numerous lesser spirits) were generally not made into any form of idol or material form for worship apart from some small objects used in ceremony and divination. However, it was more prevalent that certain places or objects like rocks, bamboo clumps, giant trees such as Baka or Ivi trees, caves, isolated sections of the forest, dangerous paths and passages through the reef were considered sacred and home to a particular Kalou-Vu or Kalou-Yalo and were thus treated with respect and a sense of awe and fear, or "Rere", as it was believed they could cause sickness, death, or punish disobedience. Others would provide protection. Thomas Williams and James Calvert in their book "Fiji and the Fijians" writes:

Idolatry - in the strict sense of the term - he seems to have never known, for he makes no material attempts to fashion material representations of his gods.

The main gods were honoured in the Bure Kalou or temple. Each village had its Bure Kalou and its priest (Bete). Villages that played a pivotal role in the affairs of the Vanua had several Bure Kalou. The Bure Kalou was constructed on a high, raised rock foundation that resembled a rough pyramid base and stood out from other bures because of its high roof, which formed an elongated pyramid shape. Inside, a strip of white masi cloth hung from the top rafters to the floor as conduit of the god. More permanent offerings hung around the wall inside. Outside of the Bure Kalou, plants with pleasant aromas were grown which facilitated spiritual contact and meditation. Many of the gods were not celebrated for their sympathetic ear to man or their loving natures, rather they were beings of supernatural strength and abilities that had little concern for the affairs of man. Peter France (1966:109 and 113) notes:

Local gods were plentiful, but were celebrated in legend and song more for the wild obscenities of their sylvan antics than for their influence in human affairs...The old tales [told] of gymnastic encounters in bathing places, which celebrated, with hilarious ribaldry, the sexual prowess of ancestor-gods.

First and foremost among the Kalou-vu was Degei, who was a god of Rakiraki but was known throughout most of the Fiji Group of islands except for the eastern islands of the Lau group. He was believed to be the origin of all tribes within Fiji and his power was superior to most, if not all, the other gods. He was often depicted as a snake, or as half snake and half stone. R.A Derrick (1957:11) says:

In these traditions Degei figures not only as the origin of the people, but also as a huge snake, living in a cave near the summit of the mountain Uluda - the northernmost peak of the Nakauvadra Range. Earth tremors and thunder were ascribed as his uneasy turnings within the cave. He took no interest in his people's affairs; his existence was no more than a round of eating and sleeping. By association with him, snakes were honoured as 'the Offspring of the origin'. The snake cult was generally throughout the group.

Other gods recognized throughout the Fiji group were: Ravuyalo, Rakola, and Ratumaibulu. Rokola was the son of Degei and was the patron of carpenters and canoe-builders, while Ratumaibulu assured the success of garden crops. Ravuyalo would stand watch on the path followed by departed spirits: he would look to catch them off guard and club them. His purpose was to obstruct their journey to the afterlife (Bulu).

=== Aspects and practices of the old religion ===
Consulting the gods

The different gods were consulted regularly on all manner of things from war to farming to forgiveness. The Bete (Priest) acted as a mediator between the people and the various Gods. R.A Derrick (1957:10 and 12) notes:

The gods were propitiated to ensure favourable winds for sailing, fruitful seasons, success in war, deliverance from sickness...In times of peace and prosperity, the Bure Kalou might fall into disrepair; but when drought and scarcity came, or war threatened, the god was remembered, his dwelling repaired, its priest overwhelmed with gifts and attention.

Rev. Joseph Waterhouse (1854:404) reports on the types of worship offered to the gods:

"The temple-worship of the gods consists of the lovi, an act of propitiation; the musukau, an act of covenant or solemn vow; the soro, and act of atonement for sin; and the madrali, an act of thanksgiving. The first-fruits of the earth are invariably presented to the gods."

As a medium of the god, the Bete relied on dreams and, when inspired, fell into trances. His body trembled as he was possessed and in a strange voice he announced the message of the god.

Laura Thompson (1940:112) speaking of the situation in Southern Lau states with regard to the Bete:

The priest had charge of the worship of the clan's ancestor gods (Kalou vu). He was the intermediary for the people and the god. Since he was influential in securing mana from the god, he was feared and respected. He controlled the activities of the people in warfare, in times of famine, and in sickness, receiving offerings from the people and presenting them to the god according to the sevusevu ceremonial pattern...The principal offerings were first fruits, kava, and cooked feasts, including human sacrifices. As a small offering wreaths were presented. The priest prayed to the god, who presently took possession of him and spoke through him or revealed his will by means of a sign or omen...When a priest was possessed his whole body shook in convulsions and his flesh twitched...The people gave a loud cry as the god took possession of the priest. When the god finally left the Bete was served with Yaqona. After the ceremony the priest and his clan consumed the sacred offerings.

Rev. Joseph Waterhouse (1854:404/405) notes:

All the offerings (to the gods) refer to the present life. The Fijians propitiate the gods for success in war, offspring, deliverance from danger and sickness, fruitful seasons, fine weather, rain, favourable winds, etc., etc.; but their religious ideas do neither extend to the soul, nor to another world...The influence of the priest over the common people is immense, although he is generally the tool of the chief. Indeed, these two personages most usually act in concert.

Witchcraft

Consulting the spirit world and using them to influence daily affairs were part of the Fiji religion. Using various specially decorated natural objects like a conch shell bound in coconut fibre rope or war club, it was a form of divination and was not only in the realm of priests. It was referred to as "Draunikau" in the Bauan vernacular and the practice was viewed as suspicious, forcing the practitioners to do it stealthily. R.A Derrick (1957:10 and 15) writes:

The Fijians...attributed all unexplained phenomena to gods, spirits or to witchcraft...Sickness and insanity were the work of malignant spirits, and food gardens wilted under their spells. In such cases sorcery was assumed and steps were taken to find the sorcerer and counter his spell with another, more potent.

A.M Hocart (1929:172) claims:

That Ba was considered to be the home of witchcraft and that Moala, Mualevu and Matuku also have a bad reputation for witchcraft.

Dreaming

Dreams were also viewed as a means by which spirits and supernatural forces would communicate with the living and communicate special messages and knowledge. A dream where close relatives were seen conveying a message was termed "Kaukaumata" and was an omen warning of an approaching event that may have a negative impact on the dreamer's life. R.A Derrick, 1957:15-16:

Special knowledge could be gained through dreams and, while dreaming, people could be told to do certain things - even murder.

Bert O. States in his book Dreaming and Story Telling states: "They believe dreams are real experiences of the wandering soul released by sleep..."

In some instances, there was also a person whose sole purpose was to interpret dreams. He or she was referred to as the "Dautadra", or the "dream expert". Martha Kaplan in her book Neither Cargo Nor Cult: Ritual Politics and the Colonial Imagination in Fiji notes:

Seers (Daurai) and dreamers (Dautadra) could predict the future, communicating with deities either in a trance or a dream.

Mana

"Mana" could be loosely translated as meaning magic or power or prestige, but it is better explained by anthropologist Laura Thompson (1940:109) when she writes:

The concept of mana associated with the ancestor cult is strong in the native pattern of thought. According to this concept mana is the vital force or potency which gives supernatural significance to persons or things...Its presence in a person or thing is not attributed to power inherent in the thing itself but to some spiritual force lodging in it...The first-born of each noble clan was the temporary repository of the mana of the clan's ancestral forefathers. The chiefs had the strongest forefathers and the high chief was the most sacred because theoretically they received mana from the most powerful ancestor gods.

Ana I. González in her web article "Oceania Project Fiji" writes:

Mana is a term for a diffuse supernatural power or influence that resides in certain objects or persons and accounts for their extraordinary qualities or effectiveness. In Melanesia a stone having mana may be buried in a garden to increase the crops. Mana may also be attached to songs, dreams or ideas. Mana is not the same as a personal power or influence. It is an arbitrary, uncontrollable force that may come or go without explanation.

In modern Fiji, while the term is still used in a traditional sense, it has a more generalized use and with the introduction of the Fijian Bible it is used to describe miracles. The term Mana, when used in ceremonial speech, can be interpreted as "it is true and has come to pass."

Afterlife

At death it is believed that the spirits of the dead would set off on a journey to Bulu, which is the home of the dead sometimes described as a paradise. Immediately after death the spirit of the recently departed is believed to remain around the house for four days and after such time it then goes to a jumping off point (a cliff, a tree, or a rock on the beach). At that point the spirit will begin their journey to the land of spirits (Vanua Ni Yalo). The spirit's journey would be a dangerous one because the god Ravuyalo would try to obstruct and hinder it on its travels to Vanua Ni Yalo. Anthropologist Laura Thompson (1940:115) writes:

The dominant belief...is that when a man dies his soul goes to Nai Thibathiba, a 'jumping-off' place found on or near each island, usually facing the west or northwest. From here the soul goes to Nai Thombothombo, the land of souls located on the Mbua coast, of Vanua Levu.

=== Myth and legend ===
The Fijian race origins have many different lines passed down through oral traditional story or in relics of songs and dance, the most practical is found oral history. In myth it is accepted by most Fijians that their origins are found through the Kalou Vu Degei. An alternative tale from times past was published in the first part of the 19th century by Ms. Ann Tyson Harvey. This tells of Lutunasobasoba, supposedly a great ancestral chief and a brother of Degei II, whose people came to settle Fiji. The third story of Fijian origin is muddled in the two stories, but can be found in a local article referred to as the: "NAMATA", or the face. There are variations of this story; some versions state three migrations, some exclude Lutunasobasoba and have only Degei, but they have common themes.

In the writings of Ms. Ann Tyson Harvey (1969) in her paper "The Fijian Wanderers" she writes of Tura, who was a tribal chieftain in a time which pre-dates the era of the great pyramids. He lived near what is known as Thebes in Egypt. Legend speaks that his tribe journeyed to South Africa and settled on Lake Tanganyika in Tanzania, where Tura then Married a Tanzanian woman and then with his tribes, for various reasons, traveled ocean-ward out past Madagascar, through the Asian islands, ending their journey in Fiji; by this time Tura had died and his son Lutunasobasoba was leader. During a storm in the waters of the Mamanuca Island Group, he lost the chest of Mana, or more practically put, he lost the chest containing Fiji's ancestors' written history before Fiji, including the written language.

Tired, old, sick, and weary, Lutunasobasoba set foot at Veiseisei and from there the early Fijians settled Fiji and his children were Adi Buisavuli, whose tribe was Bureta, Rokomautu whose tribe was Verata, Malasiga whose tribe was Burebasaga, Tui Nayavu whose tribe was Batiki, and Daunisai whose tribe was Kabara. It is believed in this mythology that his children gave rise to all the chiefly lines.

However, it is said that smoke was already rising before Lutunasobasoba set foot on Viti Levu. Villagers of the Province of Ra say that he was a trouble maker and was banished from Nakauvadra along with his people; it's been rumored the story was a fabrication of early missionaries. It is also believed there were three migrations, one led by Lutunasobasoba, one by Degei, and another by Ratu, traditionally known to reside in Vereta, along with numerous regional tales within Fiji that are not covered here and still celebrated and spoken of in story, song and dance.

These histories have an important role in ceremony and social polity, as they are an integral part of various tribes' history and origins. They are often interconnected between one tribe and another across Fiji, such as the Fire walkers of Beqa and the Red prawns of Vatulele, to mention but a few. Also, each chiefly title has its own story of origin, like the Tui Lawa or Ocean Chieftain of Malolo and his staff of power and the Gonesau of Ra who was the blessed child of a Fijian Kalou yalo. The list goes on, but each, at some turn, find a common point of origin or link to the other.

== Religion in modern Fiji ==
The term "Modern Fiji" in this article means Fiji after cession to Great Britain.

=== Christianity in Fiji ===
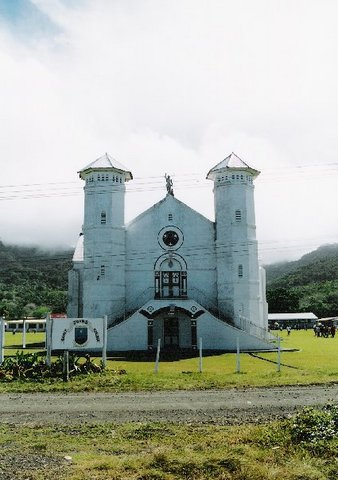
St John's Catholic Church on the Island Of Ovalau

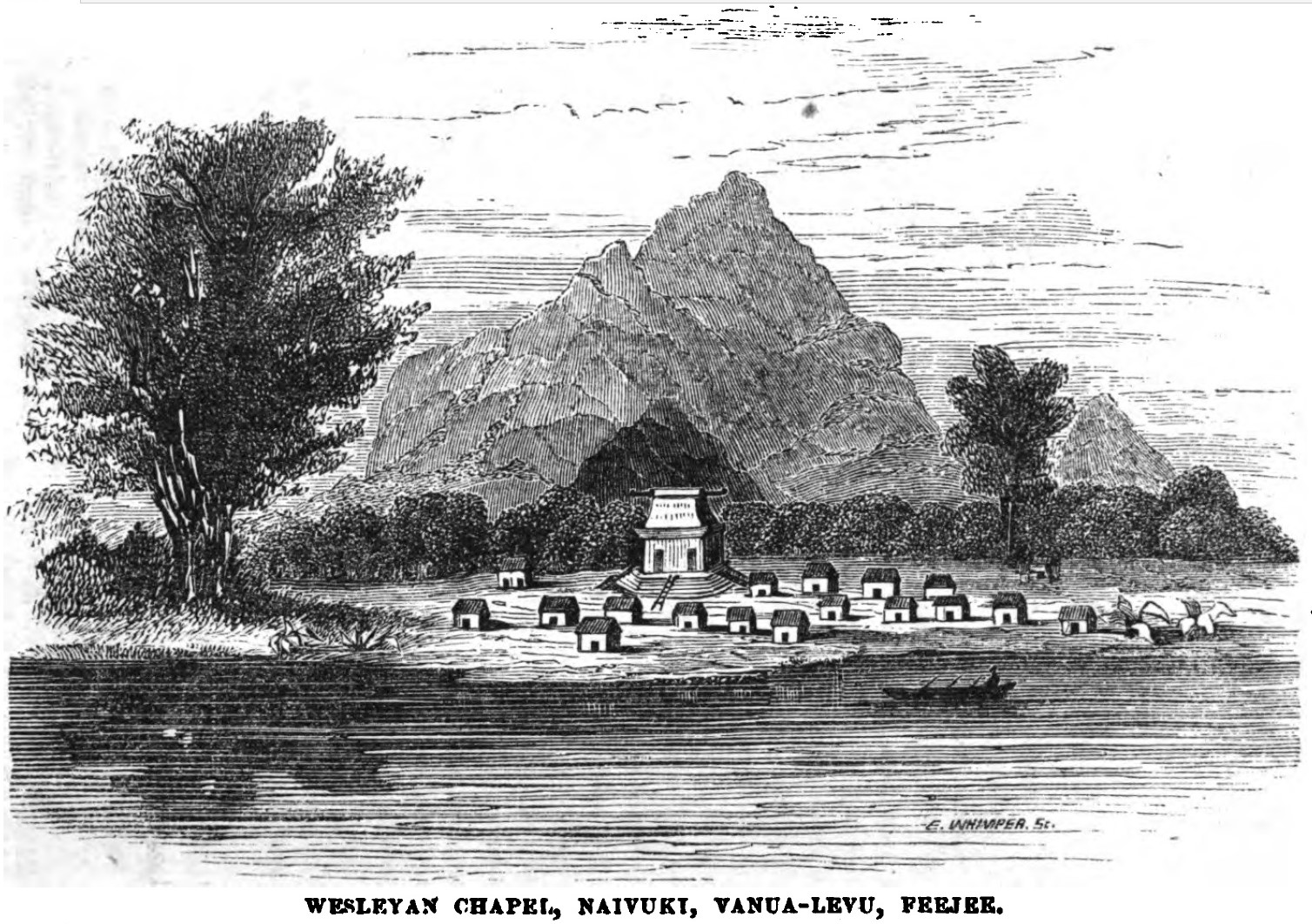
Wesleyan Chapel, Naivuki, Vanua-Levu, Feejee (September 1853, X, p. 96)

Christianity came to Fiji via Tonga, who were more receptive to the European visitors. As Tongan influence grew in the Lau Group of Fiji, so did Christianity under the Tongan Prince Enele Ma'afu. Its advancement was solidified further by the conversion of the emerging Dominant chieftain of Bau, Seru Epenisa Cakobau. The cession of 1874 saw a more dominant role within Fijian society as the old religion was gradually replaced by the new Christian faith. Bure Kalou were torn down and in their place churches were erected. Most influential were the Methodist denomination, which is the majority today, but other denominations such as Catholicism and Anglicanism, amongst other offshoots such as Baptists, Pentecostal and others, are a part of current Fijian religion. The Church of Jesus Christ of Latter-day Saints was established in Fiji in the 1950s and by 2019, it reported 50 congregations, a technical college, and a Temple. There are over 200 Orthodox Christians, with 4 churches and one monastery.

=== Hinduism in Fiji ===
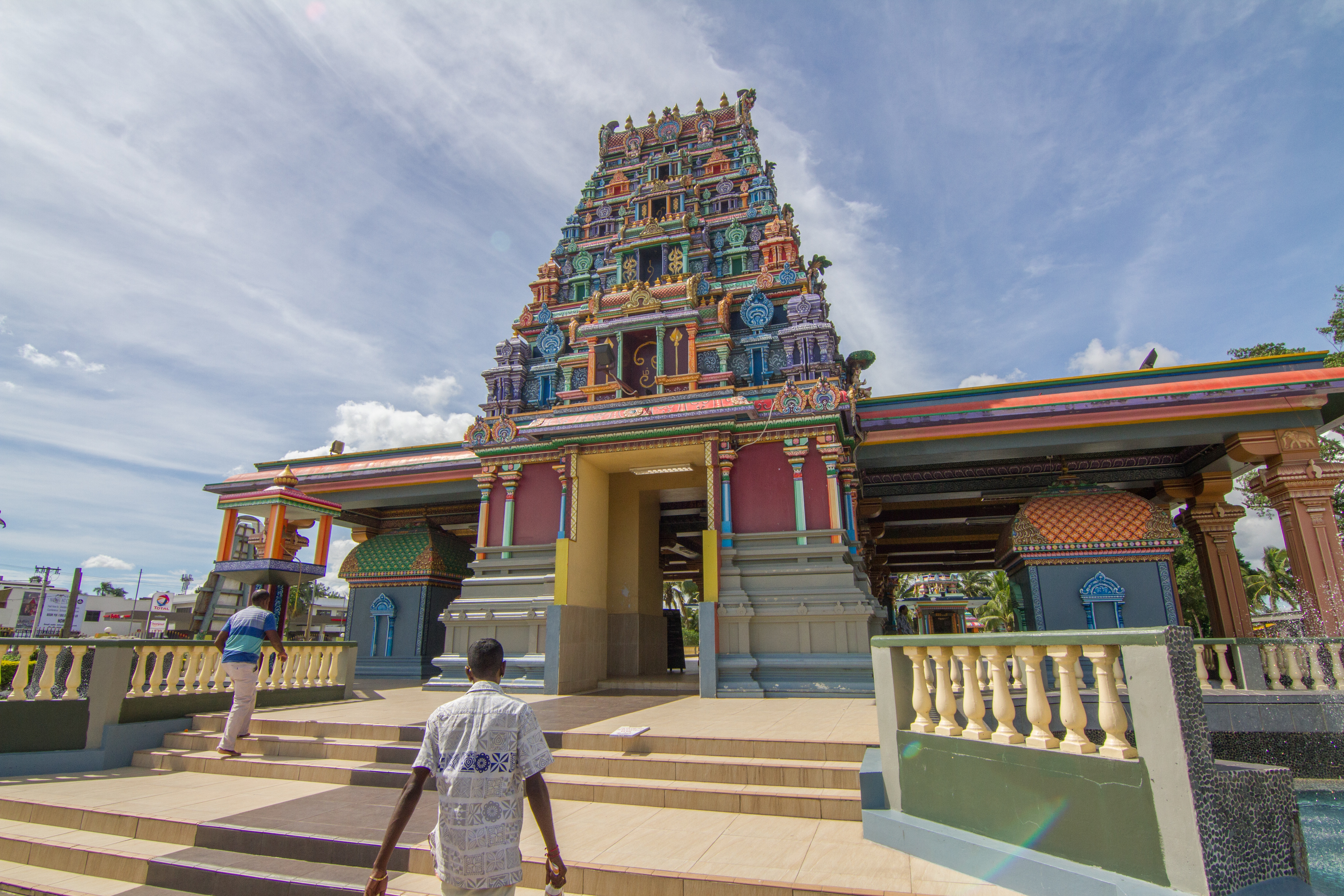
Sri Siva Subramaniya Temple, Nadi

According to the 2007 census, Hindus form the second largest religious group in Fiji, comprising 27% of the population. Hinduism in varying forms was the first of the Eastern religions to enter Fiji, with the introduction of the indentured labourers brought by the British authorities from India.

=== Islam in Fiji ===
Muslims in the country are mainly part of the Indo-Fijian community, they form about 6.3 percent of the total population (62,534). The Ba province in Fiji has more than 20,000 Muslims and is the most Muslim dominated area in Fiji.

=== Other religions in Fiji ===
Sikhism is also present among the Indo-Fijian population.

=== Fiji's old religion ===
While much of the old religion is now considered not much more than myth, some aspects of witchcraft and the like are still practiced in private, and many of the old deities are still acknowledged, but avoided, as Christianity is followed by the majority of indigenous Fijians.

== Fiji religion in society and politics ==
The constitution of Fiji establishes the freedom of religion and defines the country as a secular state, but also provides that the government may override these laws for reasons of public safety, order, morality, health, or nuisance, as well as to protect the freedom of others. Discrimination on religious grounds is outlawed, and incitement of hatred against religious groups is a criminal offense. The constitution further states that religious belief may not be used as an excuse for disobeying the law, and formally limits proselytization on government property and at official events.

Religious organizations must register with the government through a trustee in order to be able to hold property and to be granted tax-exempt status.

Religious groups may run schools, but all religious courses or prayer sessions must be optional for students and teachers. Schools may profess a religious or ethnic character, but must remain open to all students.

Religion, ethnicity, and politics are closely linked in Fiji; government officials have criticized religious groups for their support of opposition parties. In 2017, the Republic of Fiji Military Forces issued a press release stating that Methodist leaders were advocating for the country to become "a Christian nation" and that this could cause societal unrest. Following the press release, Methodist leaders distanced themselves from their previous statements, and other religious leaders also affirmed the non-political nature of their religious movements.

Many Hindus of Fiji have emigrated to other countries. Several Hindu temples have been burned, including the Kendrit Shiri Sanatan Dharam Shiv Temple. While Hindus face less persecution than before, a Hindu temple was vandalized in 2017. Later that year, following an online post by an Indian Muslim cleric visiting the country, a significant amount of anti-Muslim discourse was recorded on Fijian Facebook pages, causing controversy.

=== Military-church relations ===
The Military of Fiji has always had a close relationship to Fiji's churches, particularly the Methodist Church, to which some two-thirds of Indigenous Fijians belong.

== See also ==
- Catholicism in Fiji
- Fijian mythology
- Grace Road Church
- Hinduism in Fiji
- Islam in Fiji
- Methodist Church of Fiji and Rotuma
