= Buivaroro =

Fijian chief

Buivaroro
Father	Naosara
Mother	Gelegeleavanua
Wife	Tarau
Issue	Maseikula

Buivaroro (pronunciation: [mbuiβaroro]) was a Fijian High Chief and Lord of the island of Nayau.

== Biography ==
Buivaroro was born on Nayau. His father was Naosara, son of Chief Lutunasobasoba of Moala Island, whilst Buivaroro’s mother was High Chiefess Gelegeleavanua. His younger brother was High Chief Kalouyalewa of Lakeba and their sister was Adi Keletu.

Upon reaching adulthood, Buivaroro and his brother removed themselves to Lakeba. After their father died, Buivaroro returned to Nayau and succeeded to his father as Lord of Nayau. Kalouyalewa remained on Lakeba.

Buivaroro married a woman named Adi Tarau, a Lady of Totoya. She is not to be confused with Tarau of Tovu Totoya. Their son was Maseikula, who succeeded Buivaroro.
