= Naosara =

- Issue: Buivaroro; Kalouyalewa
- Father: Lutunasobasoba

Naosara (pronunciation: NAH-OH-SARAH) was a Fijian High Chief, an ancestor of Fijian royal family.

He was also called Tuʻivanuakula II or Tuʻinaosara. Tu'i means "chief".

== Biography ==
Naosara was a son of the High Chief Lutunasobasoba, who is also known as Kubunavanua and was a brother of Degei II. Naosara's mother was High Chiefess Miranalesakula, whose parents are not known.

A brother of Naosara was Chief Daunisai, and he also had a stepmother and at least one sister.

Coat of arms of Fiji

Naosara settled on Nayau, because he was a mighty warrior that fought many battles saving Lau numerous times from being ceded to other neighbouring of the Pacific and they installed him as Lord of Nayau and claiming it as his own and thus he can be assumed to be the first holder of the title Tui Nayau. He married a woman called Gelegeleavanua. Her title was Adi. They eventually had two sons, Buivaroro and Kalouyalewa, who upon reaching adulthood removed themselves to Lakeba. Buivaroro later returned to Nayau and succeeded to his father’s title. Kalouyalewa remained on Lakeba. Naosara also had a daughter, Chiefess Keletu. Grandsons of Naosara were Chiefs Qoma, Delaivugalei, and Tongatapu.
