= Hinduism in Fiji =

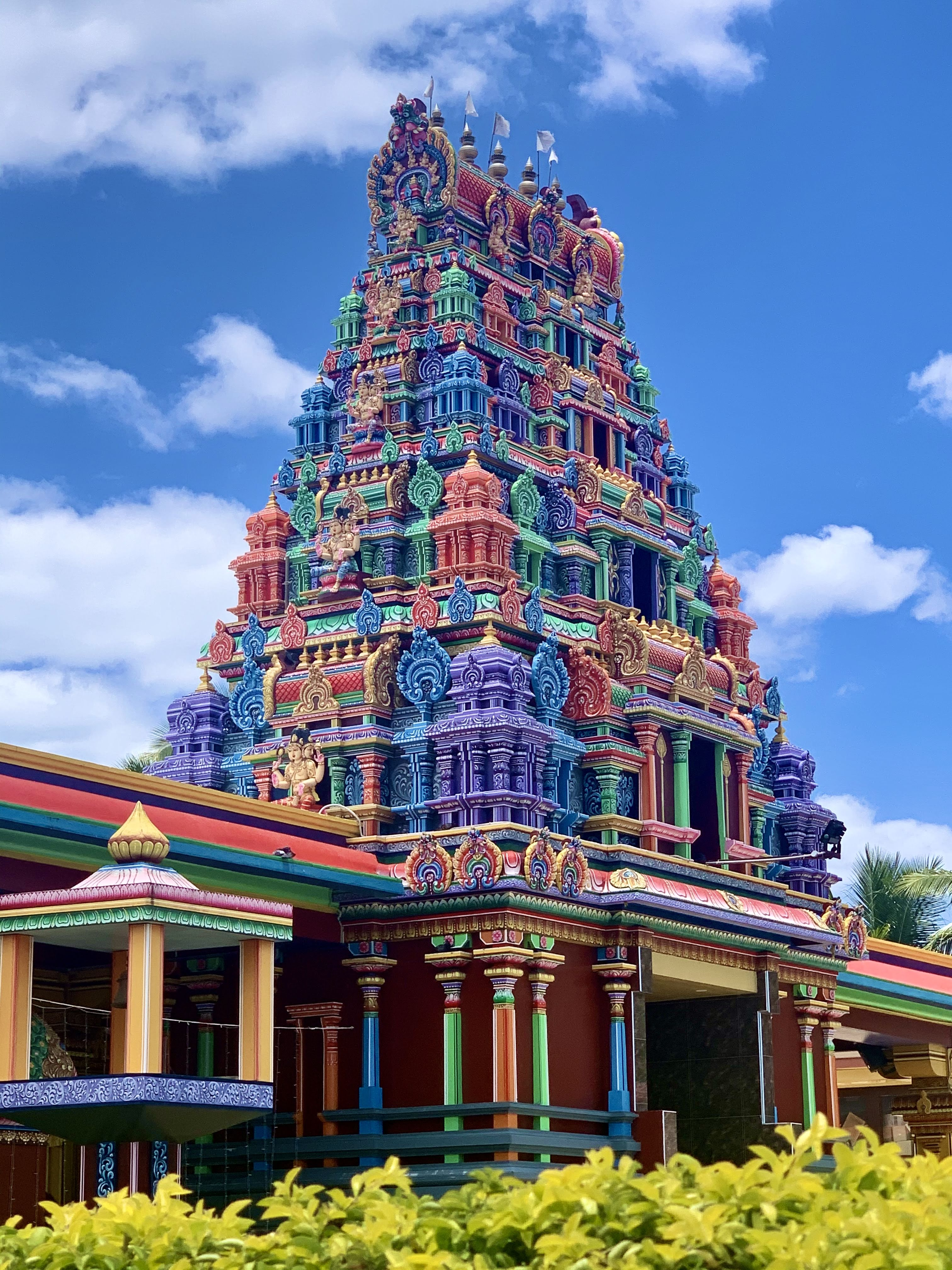
Sri Siva Subramaniya temple in Nadi

Hinduism in Fiji (Fiji Hindi: फिजी में सनातन धर्) is the second-largest religion, and primarily has a following among Indo-Fijians, the descendants of indentured workers brought to Fiji by the British from India for colonial sugarcane plantations between 1879 and 1916. Mass immigration ended in 1920, when Britain abolished the indenture system. Fiji identifies people as "Indo-Fijians" if they can trace their ancestry to the Indian subcontinent. In the 2017 census, Hindus represent 24.0% of Fiji's population.

== History ==
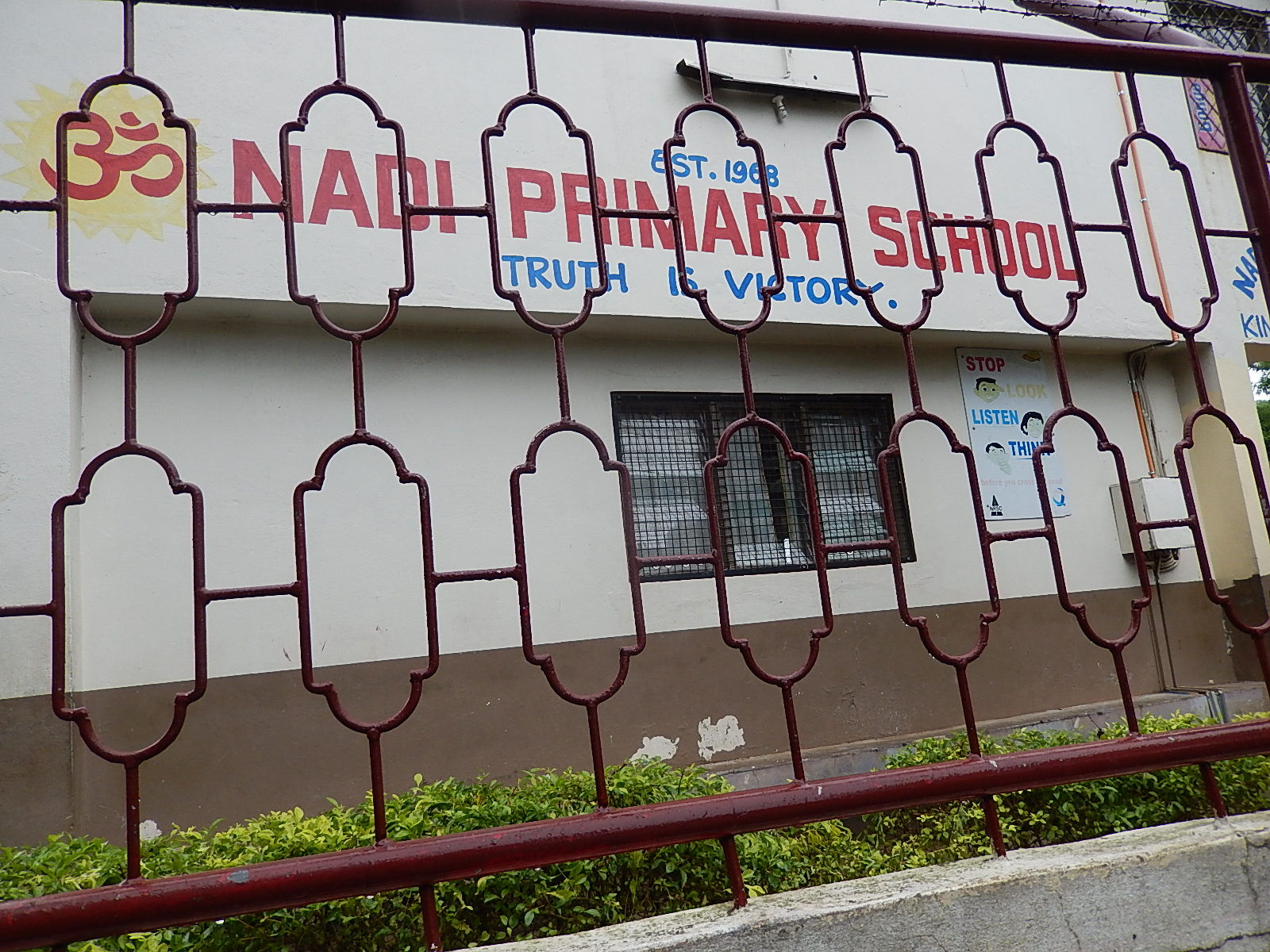
Nadi Primary School established by the Fiji Hindu community in 1968

Fiji became part of the British Empire in 1874. In 1879, the British government brought the first Indians as indentured labourers to work in the sugarcane plantations owned by British colonial officials. By 1916, about 60,000 Indians had been brought to Fiji, with job advertisements and work contracts that promised Indians right to return or right to stay, own land and live freely in Fiji after the 5-year work contract period was over. These contracts were called girmit (phonetically derived from the English word "agreement").

Nearly 85% of those brought to Fiji as indentured labourers were Hindus, with Muslims, Christians and Sikhs constituting the minority. Most were from poor rural areas. Their migration was part of a wider movement of indentured labour from India, China, and southeast Asian countries to plantations and mining operations in the Pacific Islands, Africa, Caribbean, and South American nations. About 75% came from northern India (primarily Uttar Pradesh but also Bihar, Jharkhand, Haryana and Punjab) with the other 25% coming from southern India (primarily Tamil Nadu), each group bringing their own version of Hinduism.

Many indentured Hindu labourers in Fiji preferred to return to India after their indentured labour contract was over. Estimates suggest 40% had returned by 1940, with higher return rates in early years. In 1920, after non-violent civil protests led by Gandhi against the indentured system in British colonies around the world, Britain abolished the system. This stopped the inflow of new Indian labour into Fiji plantations, while Indians continued to leave Fiji plantations. The departure of productive, low cost Indian labour became a serious labour shortage problem for the British plantations. In 1929, the British colonial government granted Indo-Fijian Hindus electoral and some civil rights, in most part to stabilize exports and profits from its Fijian sugar plantations and to prevent Indian labourers from leaving from the labour-intensive plantations. But the electoral rights granted were limited, not proportional but racial quota based, and the government segregated Indo-Fijians in a manner similar to South Africa, that is on communal and racial basis from Europeans and native Fijians. This system was resisted by the Hindus, and in an act of peaceful protest, Hindus refused to accept the segregated council. However, within years, the Hindu community split along the lines of majority Sanatan Dharma group and a minority Arya Samaj group, a situation that delayed further development of Indo-Fijian political rights. The Arya Samaj developed an educational and religious presence among Indo-Fijians during the early twentieth century. Established on 25 December 1904, it preserved Hindu cultural traditions while promoting education for the community. In 1918, the organisation was formally registered as the Arya Pratinidhi Sabha of Fiji and established the Gurukul Primary School in Lautoka.

A colleague of Gandhi, A. D. Patel led independence initiative in Fiji, demanding civil rights for all Fijians. However, the political segregation and unequal human rights for Hindus (and other Indo-Fijians) was retained in Fiji's first Constitution as the British empire granted independence to its colony Fiji in 1970.

According to 1976 Census of Fiji, 295,000 people (or 50 percent of Fiji's population) were of Indo-Fijian origins, of which 80% were Hindus. In other words, 40 percent of Fiji's population were Hindus. After a period of persistent persecution from 1980s and several coups, which included burning of Hindu homes, arson of temples and rape, Fiji witnessed a wave of emigration of Hindus and other Indo-Fijians to Australia, New Zealand, United Kingdom, Canada and India. About 50,000 of them emigrated after the 1987 coups, between 1987 and 1992 alone. The percentage population of Hindus in Fiji has declined since then, both in total and in percentage terms.

== Demographics ==
Year	Percent	Decrease
1976	45%	-19.8%
1996	33.7%	-11.3%
2007	27.9%	-5.8%
2017	24.0%	-3.9%

In the 1976 census of Fiji, 45% of its population professed to be Hindus. From late 1980s through early 2000s, Fiji witnessed several coups and considerable communal unrest, where some Hindus faced persecution. Many Hindus in Fiji emigrated to other countries.

The 1996 census recorded 261,097 Hindus (33.7% of the total population). However, the 2007 census recorded 233,393 (27.9%) which had a -5.8% decrease. The Hindu community in Fiji has built many temples, schools and community centres over time. The community celebrates Diwali as their primary annual festival. According to the 1996 census most of the Hindus in Fiji are Indo-Fijians and only 864 indigenous Fijian following Hinduism.

The Hindu population in Fiji is not uniformly distributed. Population in some villages and towns such as Nadi and Nausori area have a Hindu majority.

Religion	Indigenous Fijian		Indo-Fijian		Others		TOTAL
Religion	393,575	%	338,818	%	42,684	%	775,077	%
Sanātanī	551	0.1	193,061	57.0	315	0.7	193,928	25.0
Arya Samaj	44	0.0	9,494	2.8	27	0.1	9,564	1.2
Kabir Panthi	43	0.0	73	0.0	2	0.0	120	0.0
Sai Baba	7	0.0	70	0.0	1	0.0	60	0.0
Other Hindu	219	0.1	57,096	16.9	113	0.3	57,430	7.4
All Hindus	864	0.2	259,775	76.7	458	1.1	261,097	33.7

== Society ==
The social structure among Fijian Hindus has lacked any caste structure. Scholars suggest that this lack of formation or observance of caste system among Fijian Hindus may have been because of the nature of work in Fijian plantations where everyone's profession revolved around farming, because Fijian Hindus lived together from the time they arrived in coolie ships, and because of demographic constraints faced by them. Extensive exogamy has been observed among Hindus of Fiji since the earliest days of plantation settlements, just like in other major indentured Hindu labour settlements in Mauritius, Natal (South Africa) and the Caribbean.

As with South Africa, the British colonial officials segregated people by race in Fiji. Plantation settlements in Fiji, as a policy, considered Indo-Fijian Hindus as a worker class, and did not allow them to live near or with European settlers, nor mix with native Fijian people. The segregation created a culture contact problem, that worsened over time. During the time of colonial rule, all the indigenous Fijians were proselytised and converted en masse to Christianity (mostly Methodism) by missionaries from Europe, mainly the British Isles. The Indo-Fijian Hindus, however, largely refused to convert and the great majority have remained Hindus to this very day.

== Culture ==
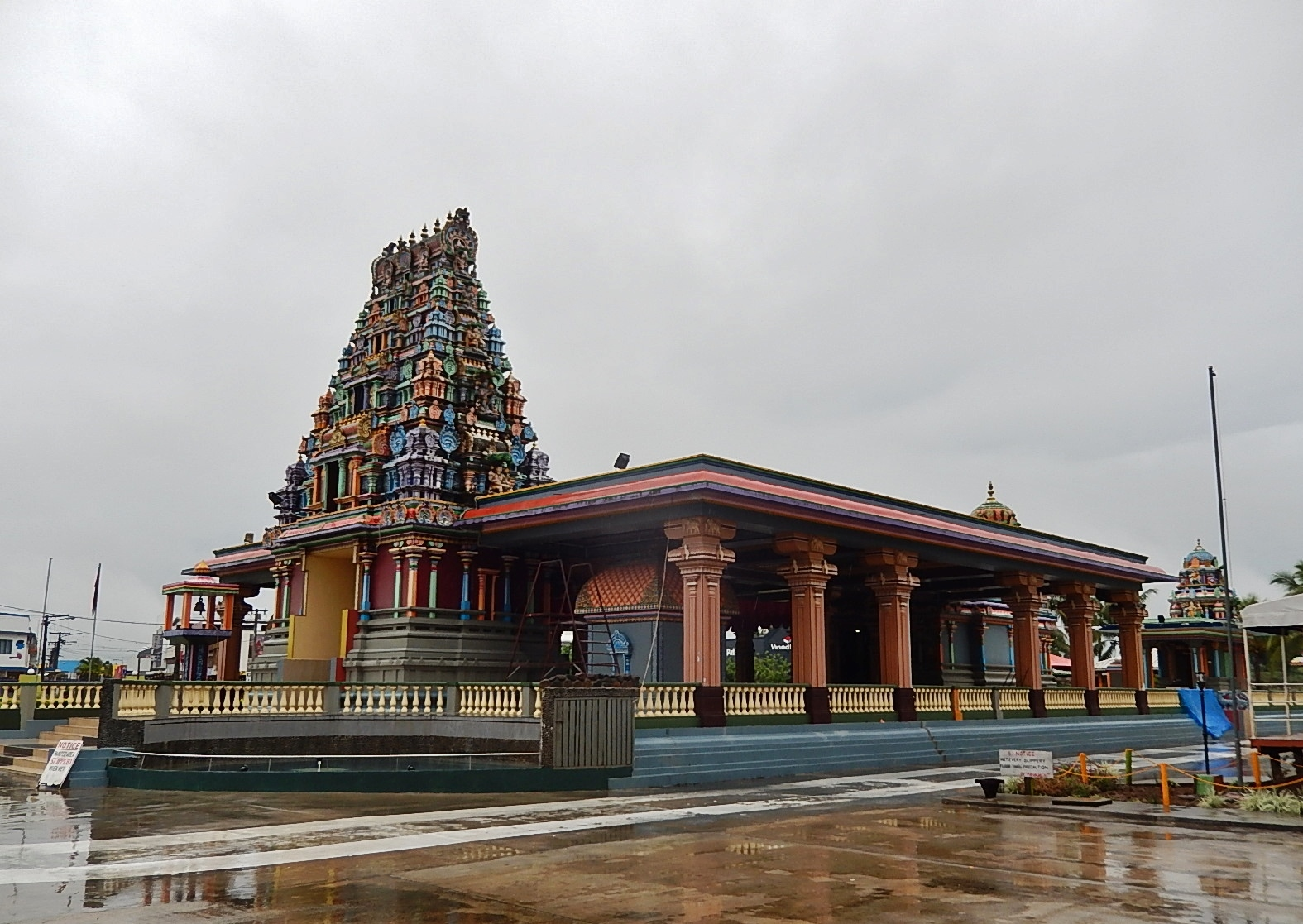
Sri Siva Subramaniya Hindu Temple in Nadi, Fiji

Fijian Hindus celebrate Rama Navami, Holi and Diwali. Of these, Diwali is a public holiday in Fiji.

In the first half of 20th century, Holi was the principal festival for Hindus of Fiji. Thereafter, Diwali gained prominence. After Fiji gained independence from British rule, Diwali has eclipsed all other Hindu festivals, and is now the principal Fijian Hindu festival. John Kelly suggests that this may reflect socio-political situation in Fiji, the segregation faced by Hindus as they demanded equal political rights with European residents and native Fijian people. This shift in cultural milieu among Hindus in Fiji, posits Kelly, may be because Holi is a transcendence-oriented, all inclusive, extrospective festival, while Diwali is a perfection-oriented devotionalism and introspective festival.

Among the Hindus of Fiji, any kind of work including physical labour in farms, is culturally considered a form of puja (prayer) and religious offering.

Hindus began building temples after their arrival in Fiji. These served as venues for marriages, annual religious festivals, family prayers after the death of loved ones, and other social events. The Hindu temples were constructed both in northern and southern Indian styles. The Shiu Hindu temple at Nadawar in Nadi, for example, was built in 1910; however this temple was destroyed in an arson attack and communal violence against Hindus in 2008. Sri Siva Subramaniya Hindu Temple in Nadi is the largest Hindu temple in Fiji.

In addition to temples, Hindus built schools and community centres to improve the social and educational opportunities. For example, Kuppuswami Naidu, a devotee of Swami Vivekananda and who later was known as Sadhu Swami, visited various islands of Fiji and met diverse Hindu communities particularly from South India, to start the TISI Sangam initiative. This community effort over time created schools, nursing clinics, community assistance in farm technologies, temples and a community centre/history museum for Hindu people in Fiji.

== World War II ==
Indo-Fijians were called upon to join the cause of allied forces during World War II. Over 5,000 Hindus in Fiji served with millions of soldiers from Australia, New Zealand, India and other British colonies during the war. Indo-Fijians served in Asia and Europe during the World War II.

== Persecution ==
By the time Fiji gained independence from the British colonial empire, Hindus and other Indo-Fijians constituted nearly fifty-percent of the total Fijian population. Nevertheless, the colonial era laws and the first constitution for Fiji, granted special rights to native Fijians. These laws relegated Hindus as unequal citizens of Fiji with unequal human rights. For example, it denied them property rights, such as the ability to buy or own land. Hindus and other Indo-Fijians have since then not enjoyed equal human rights as other Fijians. They can only work as tenant farmers for Fijian landlords. The difference in human rights has been a continuing source of conflict between "native" Fijians and Indo-Fijians, with native Fijians believing Fiji to be their ancestral land that only they can own, and Indo-Fijians demanding equal rights for all human beings.

Beyond land ownership, Hindus have been persecuted in the Fijian communal structure. Spike Boydell states, "the British introduced the divisive and unworkable system of communal representation and communal electoral rolls. Thus, different communities were represented by their own kind. This still extends to schooling in a prevailing quasi apartheid educational system."

During the late 1990s, Fiji witnessed a series of riots by radical native Fijians against Hindus (and other Indo-Fijians). In the spring of 2000, the democratically elected Fijian government led by Prime Minister Mahendra Chaudhry was held hostage by a group headed by George Speight. They demanded a segregated state exclusively for the native Fijians, thereby legally abolishing any human rights the Hindu inhabitants have. Hindu owned shops, Hindu schools and temples were destroyed, vandalised and looted.

The Methodist Church of Fiji and Rotuma, and particularly Sitiveni Rabuka who led the 1987 coup in Fiji, and the current Prime Minister, called for the creation of a Christian State and endorsed forceful conversion of Hindus after a coup d'état in 1987.

Between 1996 and 2002, 25 Hindu temples were reportedly desecrated, reports included arson, destruction of religious images, theft and burning of religious books. Academic accounts also document repeated attacks on individual Hindu temples after the 1987 coup. The Nau Durga Temple was broken into while in January 1990, a copy of Ramcharitramanas was removed from the temple and burned.

In 2012, Fiji Methodist Church's president, Tuikilakila Waqairatu, called for Fiji to officially declare Christianity as the state religion; the Hindu community leaders demanded that Fiji be a secular state where religion and state are separate.

== See also ==
- Fiji
- Religion in Fiji
- Demographics of Fiji
- Indo-Fijians
