= Lutunasobasoba =

Deified Fijian ancestor

- Other names: Kubunavanua
- Gender: Male
- Region: Fiji
- Ethnic group: Fiijan

Genealogy
- Siblings: Degei
- Consorts: Miranalesakula; Radinisei (Nai of Cepi)
- Children: Naosara; Daunisai; Sagavulunavuda; Rokomautu; Rokoratu; Buisavulu; Lutunarevurevu

Lutunasobasoba is considered to be one of the ancestors of the Fijian (iTaukei) people, along with Degei.

According to one story, they originated near Lake Tanganyika and sailed to sea in the Kaunitoni and several other canoes. The Kaunitoni became holed in the western reef of Viti Levu, just north of the village of Viseisei. One faction, with Lutunasobasoba as a chief, decided to make a home there. Degei, with the Kaunitoni, decided to sail east on the coast and landed at Rakiraki, settling in the Nakauvandra Mountains.

This particular story is believed to have been originated from a competition held in the late 1870s by missionaries who were looking to develop a more fanciful story than that which existed in Fijian circles at the time. The winning story tells that Degei and Lutunasobasoba were gods from Lake Tanganyika.

In modern times it is believed that Fiji's first inhabitants were Proto-Polynesians of the Lapita culture, whose ancestors were from South East Asia.

== Variations ==
According to the most popular variation, three chiefs, Lutunasobasoba, Degei, and Waicalanavanua lived in a land to the far west. For some cause, long since forgotten, they resolved to leave that land with their wives and children. They had a great canoe, which they called the Kaunitoni, built by the craftsman Rokola. In her they set sail, and with them went a number of other canoes, all seeking a new land. They found many lands, and at each some of the people stayed to make it their adopted home; but none of them pleased Lutunasobasoba. The Kaunitoni was struck by a great storm when she was far from land and alone. All the goods on deck were swept overboard, including a basket or box containing tablets recording their ancestors and writing system. After several days running from the storm, they came to land. They beached their canoe there and called the place Vuda (Our Origin) on the northwest corner of Viti Levu. Lutunasobasoba was greatly distressed at losing the tablets (vola) and sent a canoe to look for it. The crew discovered the Yasawa Islands, but failed to find the tablets.

They stayed at Vuda for a long time, until Lutunasobasoba became very old and infirm, and they decided to move him to higher ground. Degi had Rokola build them some new canoes, since there were now too many for the Kaunitoni. They went along the coast to the eastward, and landed in what is now the bay of Rakiraki. They carried the now dying Lutunasobasoba up the mountain which was later named Nakauvadra. They built him a hut from the materials of the pandanus tree (vadra), which grew thickly at that spot. Lutunasobasoba lived there for several years. His dying command was for them to separate and settle in different parts of the land he had discovered.

Another version tells that Tura married Ranadi of Thebes and they had two children, Lutunasobasoba and Kubunavanua. Tura had a second wife, Naiovabasali and bore him Degei, Waicalanavanua, Nakumilevu, Rokola and Erovu. They then moved to Tanigaka. From there, three ships sailed out, the Kaunitoni (captained by Lutunasobasoba), Kaunitera (by Kumilevu), and Duiyabaki (by Kubunavanua); eventually reaching the Solomon Islands. While there, they quarrelled over a turtle the crew of the Kaunitera had eaten, but not shared with the other crews. As a result, Kumilevu and his crew were left there. The Duiyabaki sailed to Lomaloma and settled there.

The residents of Moturiki say that island was settled by the crew of the Rogovoka, a ship used to transport rocks to the burial ground of the Tongan Kings, who first landed on a now submerged island called Vuniivilevu (large ivi tree), located where the Davetalevu passage (big reef pass) is now, between Viti Levu, Vanua Levu and Ovalau. When the island sank, survivors swam to Moturiki.

Another variation names the box of writings as "Katonimana, 'Box of Blessings'" (Kato = case and Mana = magic). Others like Sitiveni Rabuka, 3rd Prime Minister of Fiji, equate this box with the Ark of the Covenant and say that it is buried on Mana Island, in the Yasawa Islands. They also say that Fiijians are one of the Ten Lost Tribes.

Degei is supposed to have later returned to search for it, against the command of Lutunasobasoba. He found either the box or a large diamond near the Mamanuca islands and was changed into a serpent with a diamond pattern on its head. This serpent is said to live in the Sawa-i-Lau caves, where it is trapped and causes earthquakes.

== Family ==
Parents

- Tura (father), landed at Naicobocobo (Bua)
- Ranadi (mother)

Wives

- Adi Miranalesakula.
- Radinisei (Nai of Cepi).

Siblings

- Degi (by his father's second wife)

=== Descendants ===
Sons

- by Adi Miranalesakula.

- Naosara TuNayau, lived in Batiki area.
- Daunisai, lived in Kabara.
- Sagavuluna, stayed at Vuda

- by Radinisei

- Rokomautu, lived in Verata.
- Rokoratu / Ro Melasiga, lived in Burebasaga.

Daughter

- Buisavulu (Bui Savulu), founder of the Bureta people of Ovalau
- Lutuarevurevu fell overboard the canoe " Nakaunitoni" with the box of mana.

Family Tree of Lutunasobasoba

Tura	Ranadi
Miranalesakula	Lutunasobasoba	Radinisei
Naosara	Daunisai	Sagavuluna	Rokomautu	Rokoratu	Buisavulu

== See also ==
- Roko Tui Bau
