= Vuda Point =

Headland in Fiji

Coordinates: 17°40′S 177°22.99′E

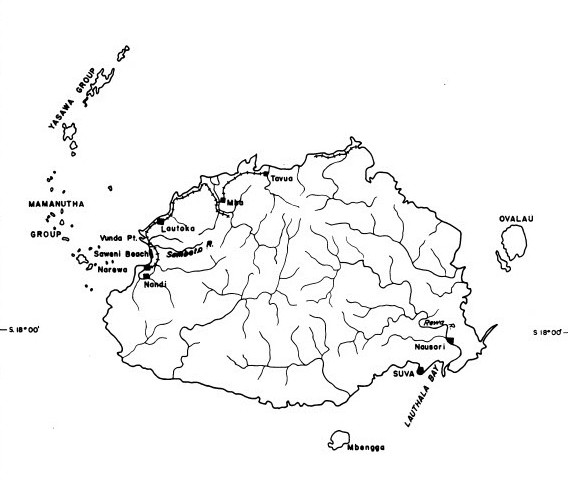
Map of Viti Levu with Vuda Point labelled as Vunda Point on the left

Vuda Point is a headland on the west coast of Viti Levu island, in Ba Province of Fiji. It is located between the towns of Nadi and Lautoka.

Vuda Point features the village of Viseisei, with the Vuda Marina yacht harbor and several small resort complexes. Nadi International Airport serves the area.

== History ==
By tradition, Vuda Point was the landing site of the canoes that brought the Melanesian ancestors of the Fijian people to the country.

Oral traditional folklore states that the chief Lutunasobasoba the progenitor of most indigenous Fijians, arrived at Vuda with his entourage, sailing from Lake Tanganyika in Tanzania East Africa and journeyed up the Tuleita to the Nakauvadra mountain ranges.

After the Second World War and the establishment of Lautoka city and wharf. The Vuda area was prime real estate due to its location near the city during the booming years of sugar production.

The first expatriate families to settle in the Vuda were the Kumars, Maharaj Sharmas, Mishras, Waddinghams, McElraths, and Goundars. They currently reside in the area except for the Mishras, along with other old families in the area, such as the Vakubuas, and the Babas.

During World War II, the US Navy built a Naval Base Fiji Fleet Recreation Center at the point.

In the 1970s an Italian husband and his Japanese wife settled at a southeastern ridge of Vuda Point. Their two sons became established engineers with international offices. In 2009 Sapphire Bay Fiji Ltd was established to develop the Sapphire Bay Fiji resort, and construction began in 2013 on several rental villas.
