= Grace Road Church =

South Korean religious movement

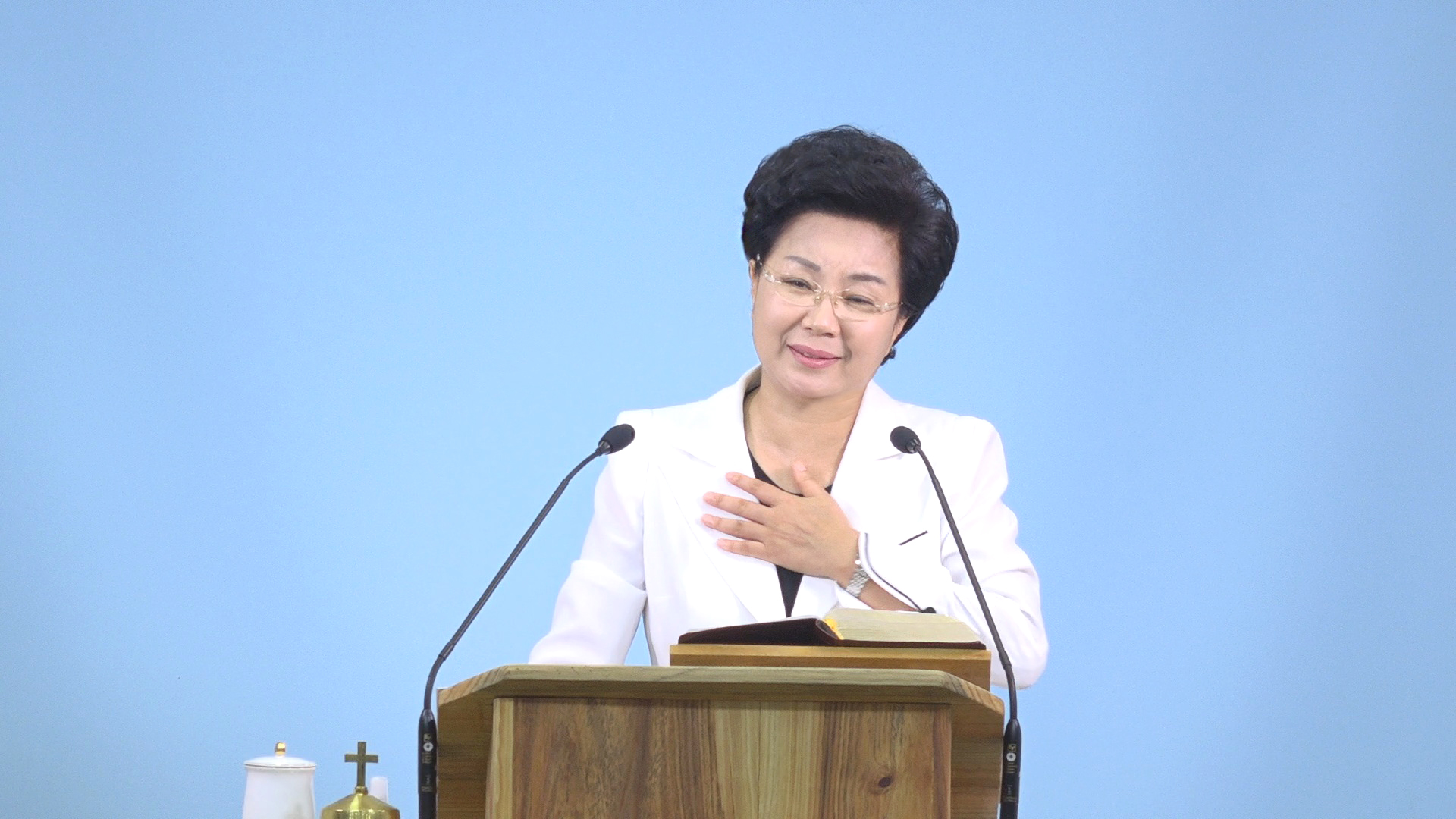
- Shin Ok-ju speaking inside Grace Road Church's Navua Hall in Fiji, 1 March 2017
- Type: Cult
- Classification: New religious movement
- Orientation: Presbyterian
- Scripture: Protestant Bible
- President: Daniel Kim (son of founder)
- Region: South Korea, Fiji
- Founder: Shin Ok-ju
- Origin: 2002; 24 years ago
- Separated from: TongHap
- Members: ~1,000

The Grace Road Church (Korean: 은혜로교회) is a South Korean new religious movement and cult founded in 2002 by its leader Shin Ok-ju. It has been based in Fiji since 2014.

The church has been accused of abusing and exploiting its members, and it was investigated by South Korean and Fijian authorities in the late 2010s. In 2020, a South Korean court sentenced Shin to seven years in prison on charges of joint injury, special assault, special confinement, fraud, child abuse, and abandonment and neglect of children.

== Church ==
=== Founding ===
According to Tark Ji-il, an expert in South Korean cults, the church was founded in 2002. The South Korean magazine Modern Religion Monthly instead reports that the church began as the Paul Theological Academy in August 2009, a Christian institute that asserted the Bible was "written in tongues" and had to be interpreted by a prophet.

=== Fiji ===
Tark argues the church shares many similarities with other South Korean cults. These include a belief in obedience of the religious leader, a group-specific interpretation of the Bible, and teaching of the imminent coming of Jesus Christ, with a provision of the place for the final shelter. The group was increasingly scrutinized by South Korea's Christian circles, and was in 2014 officially isolated as a heresy group.

According to the group's website, a missionary for the church was sent around the world to discover a land to survive the famine and, after scouting 60 countries, settled on Fiji. The group and its leader believe that Fiji is the so-called "center of the world as promised in the Bible" and moved there in 2014. After the members arrived in Fiji, all of the 400 followers' passports were allegedly seized. Mainstream churches in Fiji had reportedly accused the church of being a cult for years. A spokesman for the local Methodist Church told reporters, "I think it's common knowledge here that the movement is a cult movement ...."

=== Investigations, allegations of abuse and arrests ===
In 2014, a man with schizophrenia sued Shin for $6 million, alleging she supervised an attempt to cure his mental illness which involved bounding him with duct tape and depriving him of his medication for 10 days, ultimately causing him to lose his leg due to gangrene.

In 2018, footage emerged of the church's followers forcibly slapping each other, supposedly to "beat the Devil" out of each other. In a documentary aired in South Korea, testimony from ex-church members detailed allegations of physical abuse and overwork; Shin and other members would allegedly surround individuals and beat them. These public beatings are known as "ground thrashings". In July, Shin and two other members were arrested after arriving at Incheon Airport in Seoul. In August, South Korean police were reportedly investigating the church over allegations of unlawful imprisonment, assault, and exploitation of foreign currency. On 14 August, the church headquarters in Navua were raided by South Korean police, Fijian police, and the Fijian Department of Immigration. After the raid, followers of the church were offered consular assistance.

On 30 July 2019, Shin was found guilty and sentenced to six years' imprisonment. In 2020, upon appeal, Shin's prison term was increased to seven years on charges of joint injury, special assault, special confinement, fraud, child abuse, and abandonment and neglect of children.

In 2024, an escaped member alleged that they had suffered eight years of assault and forced labor. Additionally, the church was being investigated by Fijian authorities for interfering in the passport issuance of members' families and for legal violations by its affiliated businesses. On 6 December 2024, during an appeal, Shin faced strong protests from victims as she repeatedly claimed she did not use the "ground thrashing" beatings as a means of controlling church members.

During a January 2025 hearing for an appeal made by Shin and five other members, the court reduced Shin's sentence to four years and six months in prison. Another defendant, also surnamed Shin, had his sentence reduced from two years and six months to two years, while a defendant surnamed Kwon had his sentence reduced from three years and six months to one year and six months.

In December 2025, the US State Department alleged that the Grace Road Church was involved in human trafficking following the escape of at least four US citizens, including two children, from the sect. On 15 December, the US State Department threatened to downgrade Fiji to a "Tier 3" ranking, a move which would lead to a significant reduction in US aid to Fiji, unless the Fijian government took action against the Grace Road Church.

== Commercial activities ==
After arriving in Fiji in 2014, the church formed a conglomerate, the Grace Road Group (GRG), to begin and manage commercial ventures in the country. The church raises funds through the GRG, which employed at least 300 Koreans and 100 Fijians in August 2018. The businesses opened by the group include restaurant chains, beauty salons, a construction firm, a hardware store, and a farm started in partnership with the Fiji National University.

A statement from the organization claims that the allegations against Shin were false and "have gone too far." The statement continued, "GR Group family, who have been working proudly as owners are very enraged by all the lies ... Those who wish to slander us have created unspeakable lies about passport confiscation, forced labor, incarceration, and violence."
