= Nadi River =

River in Viti Levu, Fiji

Coordinates: 17°48′S 177°23′E

Nandi River
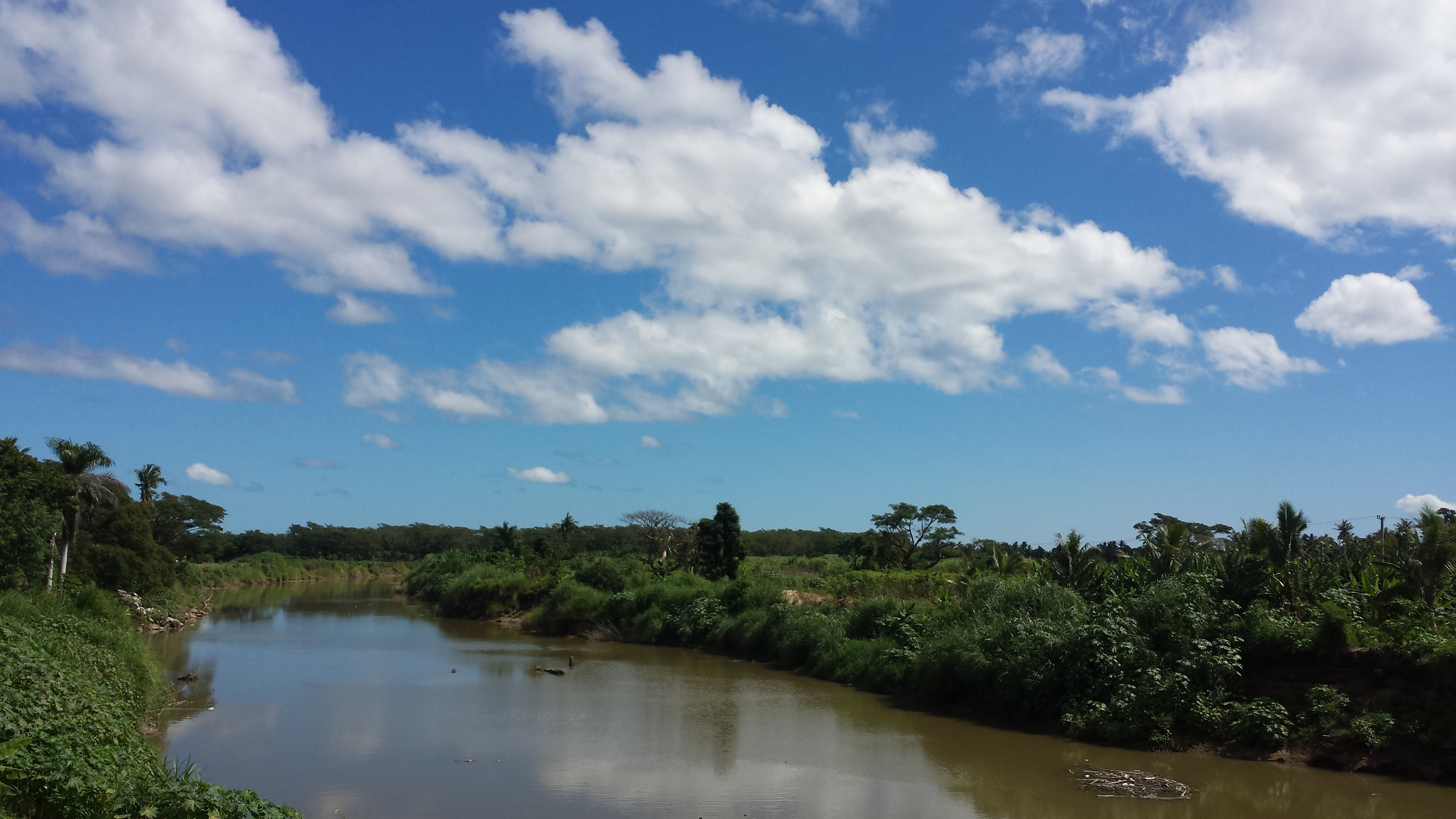
- Nadi River as seen from Queens Road bridge in Nadi.

Location
- Country: Fiji

Physical characteristics
- Source
  - location: Viti Levu

Nadi River is a river of Viti Levu, Fiji. The region experiences floods every year, damaging infrastructure and public health.

== Flood control ==
A significant problem in Nadi is flooding. As extreme weather conditions are frequent across Nadi town, the plain located in Nadi often becomes submerged.

Since 1991, 26 major floods have afflicted the Nadi catchment. In January 2009 a flood claimed 11 lives, left 12,000 people homeless and resulted in FJD113 million damages.

Hall Contracting was engaged to address the flooding in 2008-2010. The flood mitigation project involved dredging the riverbed, as many of Fiji’s coastal rivers were suffering from sediment build-up. 1.2 million cubic metres of excess sediment were removed. In addition, drainage facilities, embankments, reservoir and water conservancy facilities located in lower reaches of Nadi were improved, significantly reducing the impacts of flooding.

== See also ==
- List of rivers of Fiji
