= Viseisei =

- Village
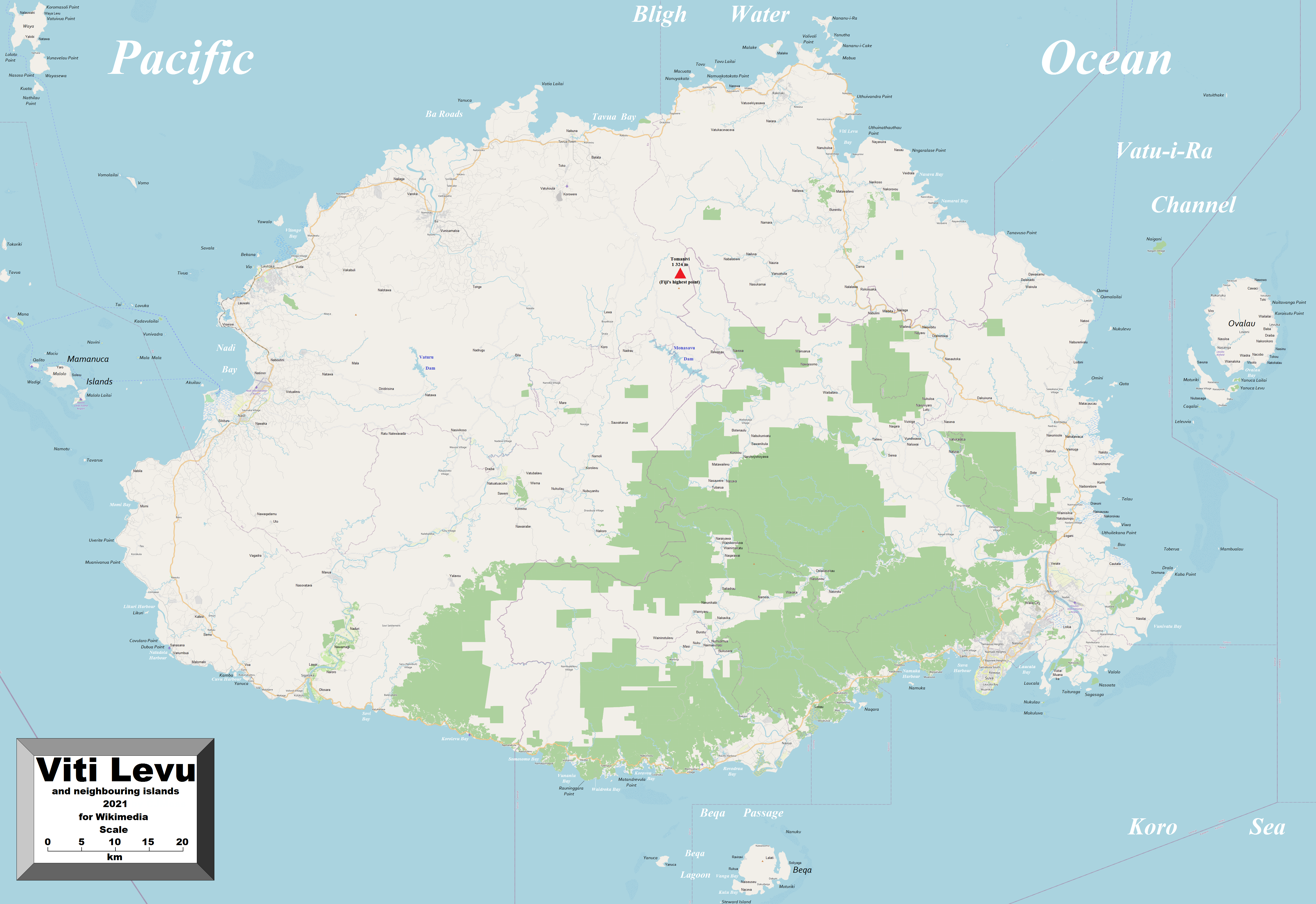
- Viti Levu with Viseisei on the west coast between Nadi and Lautoka

- Location in Fiji
- Country: Fiji
- Island: Viti Levu
- Division: Western Division
- Province: Ba
- Tikina: Vuda
- Time zone: UTC+12

Viseisei (Fijian pronunciation: [βisei̯sei̯]) is a village at Vuda Point on the west coast of Viti Levu island, in Ba Province of Fiji.

== History ==
According to tradition, it is the oldest settlement in Fiji, established by Lutunasobasoba when the first Melanesian canoes beached at Vuda Point.

Fiji's former President, Ratu Josefa Iloilo, who held the chiefly title of Tui Vuda, hailed from Viseisei. Ratu Iloilo died on 6 February 2011 at the age of 90.
