= Methodist Church of Fiji and Rotuma =

Methodist church

- Classification: Protestant
- Orientation: Methodist
- Polity: Congregationalist
- Leader: Semisi Turagavou
- Region: Fiji
- Origin: 1835
- Congregations: 2,860
- Members: 212,860
- Ministers: 430

The Methodist Church of Fiji and Rotuma is the largest Christian denomination in Fiji, with 34.6% of the total population at the most recent 2007 census.

Along with the chiefly system and the Fijian government, the Methodist Church forms a key part of Fiji's social power structure. The President of the Church, who must have been an ordained Minister for at least ten years, is elected at the annual conference for a term not exceeding three years. Tevita Nawadra Banivanua was elected President of the Church at the 2014 annual conference, and took office on 1 January 2015. He succeeded Tuikilakila Waqairatu.

== Church organization ==
The Church has 2,860 congregations served by 430 pastors. Administratively, the church is divided into 338 circuits and 56 divisions. In the 1996 census, 280,628 persons identified as Methodists; 261,972 were indigenous Fijians, 5,432 were Indo-Fijians and 13,224 were from other ethnic communities. In 2015, its membership stood at 212,860.

== Church history and affiliation ==
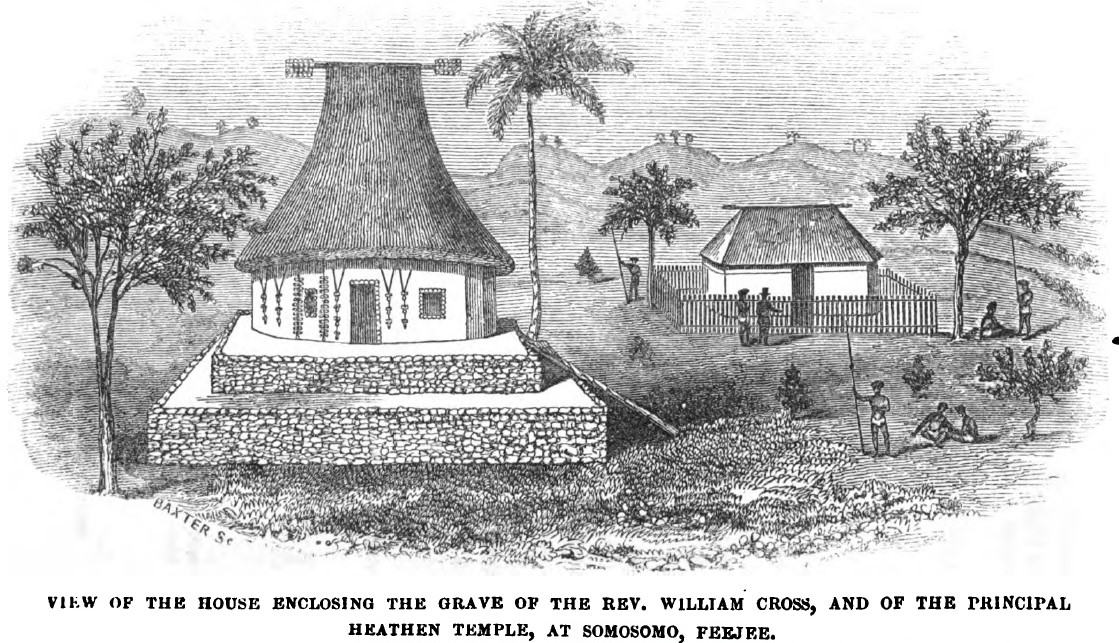
View of the house enclosing the grave of Rev. William Cross, and the principal heathen temple, at Somosomo, Feejee (IV, November 1847, p.120)

Christianity was introduced into Fiji in 1830 by three Tahitian teachers from the London Missionary Society. The Australian-based Wesleyan Missionary Society began work in Lakeba in the Lau Islands on 12 October 1835 under David Cargill and William Cross, along with some Tongans. The conversion of many prominent chiefs, including Seru Epenisa Cakobau, in 1854, led to the conversion of much of the population.

Large-scale Indian immigration to Fiji began in 1879, and the Indian Mission began in 1892.

In 1964 the Methodist Church in Fiji became an independent entity.

The Methodist Church of Fiji and Rotuma is a member of the World Council of Churches (since 1976), the Pacific Conference of Churches, the Fiji Council of Churches, and the World Methodist Council.

=== The 2006 coup d'état ===
The Methodist Church opposed the 2006 coup, although it had backed the previous three coups.

The Methodist Church strongly condemned the coup d'état carried out by the Republic of Fiji Military Forces on 5 December 2006. The church issued a 20-point statement on 2 February 2007 analyzing the various factors in the coup, including the actions of the Military Commander, Commodore Frank Bainimarama, to depose and reinstate President Ratu Josefa Iloilo, dismiss the Cabinet, and dissolve the Parliament, all of which it said were legally actionable. The statement called on Bainimarama to resign as interim Prime Minister to allow a "politically neutral" interim cabinet to be formed, comprising respected citizens. The Church also called for the 86-year-old President Iloilo, who publicly condoned the actions of the Military, to be "medically boarded" and, if necessary, "retired with dignity."

While condemning the coup, the statement stopped short of calling for the deposed government to be reinstated, instead recognizing the reality that normal democratic rule needed a process to restore it.

The statement of the Methodist Church provoked an angry reaction from Military spokesman Major Neumi Leweni, who said that the Church had allowed itself to be "used".

In the past, the Church once called for a theocracy and fueled anti-Hindu sentiment.

== See also ==
- Religion in Fiji
- Catholicism in Fiji
