= Tu'i =

Tu'i, also spelled more simplistically Tui, is a Polynesian traditional title for tribal chiefs or princes. In translations, the highest such positions are often rendered as "king". For details, see the links below various polities. Traditionally, a Tui is an equivalent of God title. Origin of Tui is believed to be Tui Manu'a (the title given to the son of the Polynesian God Tagaloa, and therefore Tui were viewed as living Gods).

== Tonga ==
See:

- Tu'i Tonga
- Tu'i Ha'atakalaua
- Tu'i Kanokupolu
- Tui Harris

== Fiji ==
See House of Chiefs (Fiji)

== Samoa ==
There are several Samoan polities and titles (several including the term Tui) in the present kingdom. On American Samoa, the paramount chief is titled Tu'i Manu'a.

== Wallis and Futuna ==
On Futuna island, see Tu`i Agaifo of Alo. There is also the Chief of Sigave; however, depending on the family, they carry the specific title of Sau?, Tamolevai, Keletaona, or Tu`i Sigave.

On `Uvea (Wallis Island), there is only the Tui `Uvea or Hau (translated by the French as king/queen; from 1858 also styled Lavelua¹).

== Sources and references ==
- WorldStatesmen- see each present country
