= Viti Levu =

Largest island in Fiji

Viti Levu विटी लेव
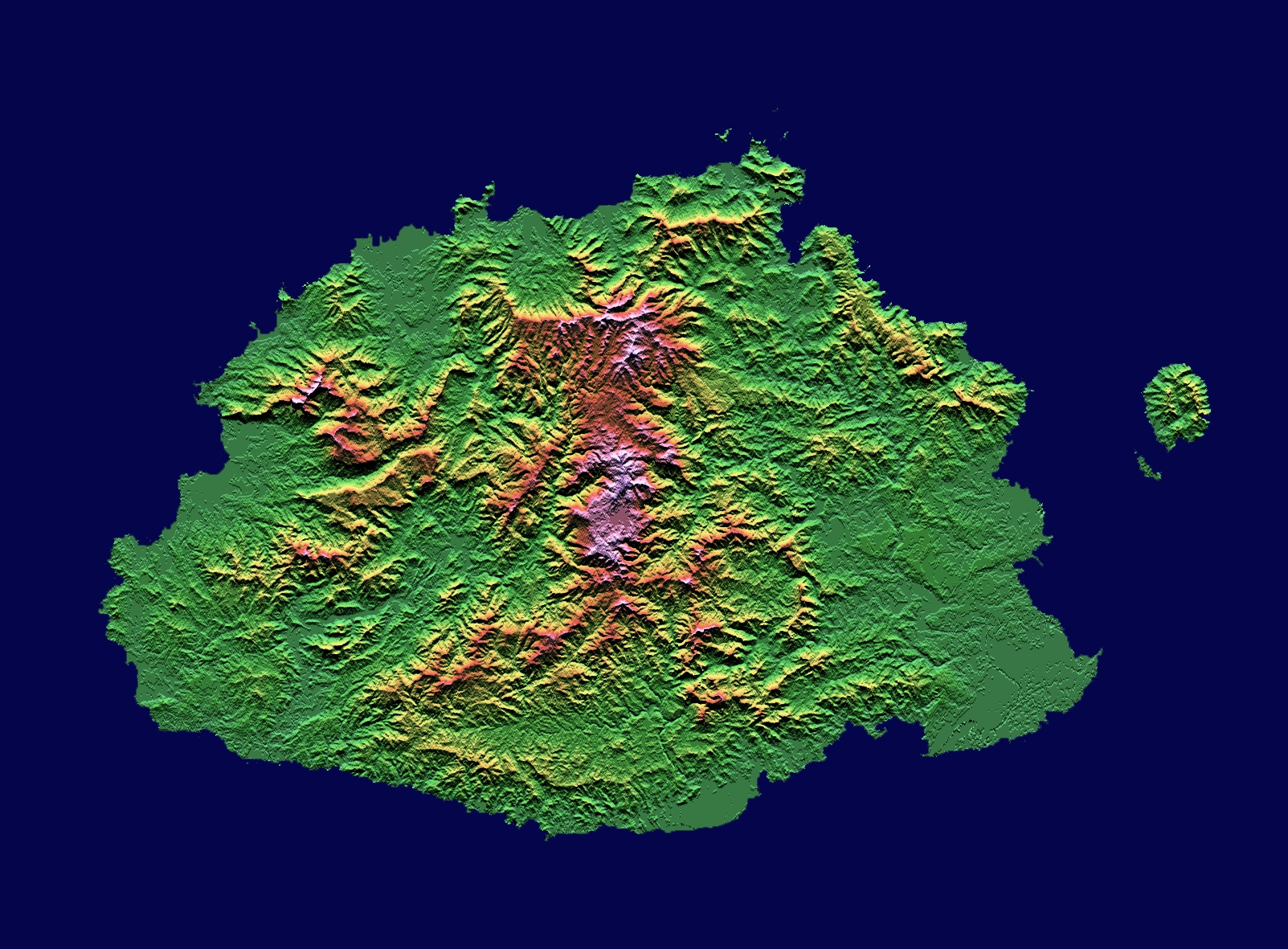
- Topography of Viti Levu island.

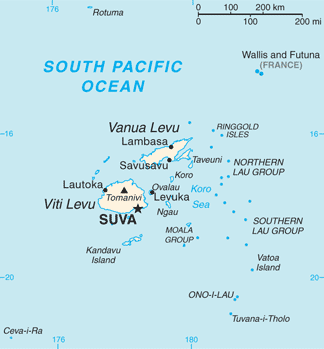

Geography
- Location: South Pacific Ocean
- Coordinates: 17°48′S 178°0′E
- Archipelago: Viti Levu Group
- Area: 10,388 km^{2} (4,011 sq mi)
- Area rank: 75th
- Length: 146 km (90.7 mi)
- Width: 106 km (65.9 mi)
- Highest elevation: 1,324 m (4344 ft)
- Highest point: Tomanivi

Administration
- Fiji
- Division: Western Division and Central Division
- Largest settlement: Suva (pop. 93,970)

Demographics
- Population: 740,000 (2022)
- Pop. density: 55.83/km^{2} (144.6/sq mi)
- Ethnic groups: Native Fijians (54.3%), Indo-Fijians (38.1%); other (Asian, Europeans, other Pacific Islander) (7.6%)

Viti Levu (Fijian: [ˈβitʃi ˈleβu]; lit. 'Great Fiji') is the largest island in Fiji. It is the site of the country's capital and largest city, Suva, and home to a large majority of Fiji's population.

== Geology ==
Fiji lies in a tectonically complex area between the Australian plate and the Pacific plate. The Fiji Platform lies in a zone bordered by active extension fault lines, around which most of the shallow earthquakes in the area have been centred. These fault lines are: the Fiji Fracture Zone (FFZ) to the north; the 176° Extension Zone (176°E EZ) to the west; and the Hunter fracture zone (HFZ) and Lau Ridge to the east.

The oldest rocks on the island are those formed during the Eocene and Early Miocene epochs that belong to the Wainimala group. The lower portion of the group is made up of volcanic flows and volcaniclastics, which grade from basalt to trachyte and rhyolite. Geographically, this group is found south of Nadi, including on the peaks of Koromba (at 3528 feet high) and Natambumgguto (at 1242 feet high), and down to Sigatoka. From Sigatoka, the group extends almost all the way to Lodoni, and includes the peaks of Tuvutau (at 3060 feet) and Tikituru (at 3071 feet). Along the southern coast it extends almost to Nausori. The group is intruded by the Tholo Plutonics, which consist of similar-age stocks of tonalite, granodiorite, gabbro and diorite. Mio-Pliocene sandstones, and marl, grading into epiclastics and andesitic Volcanic rocks of the Suva group are found mainly in the river valleys, such as those formed by the Nadi River and Navua River. The Plio-Pleistocene Mba group is found in the northern portion of the island. It consists of porphyritic basalt flows and volcaniclastics, grading into greywacke. Geographically, it includes the peaks of Koroyanitu (at 3921 feet), Malua (at 3294 feet), Monavatu (at 3708 feet), Mount Tomanivi (at 4341 feet), and Ndelamendamu (at 2540 feet). It extends along the eastern coast, almost to Nausori, and includes the Emperor Mine near Vatukoula.

== Geography, economy and ecology ==
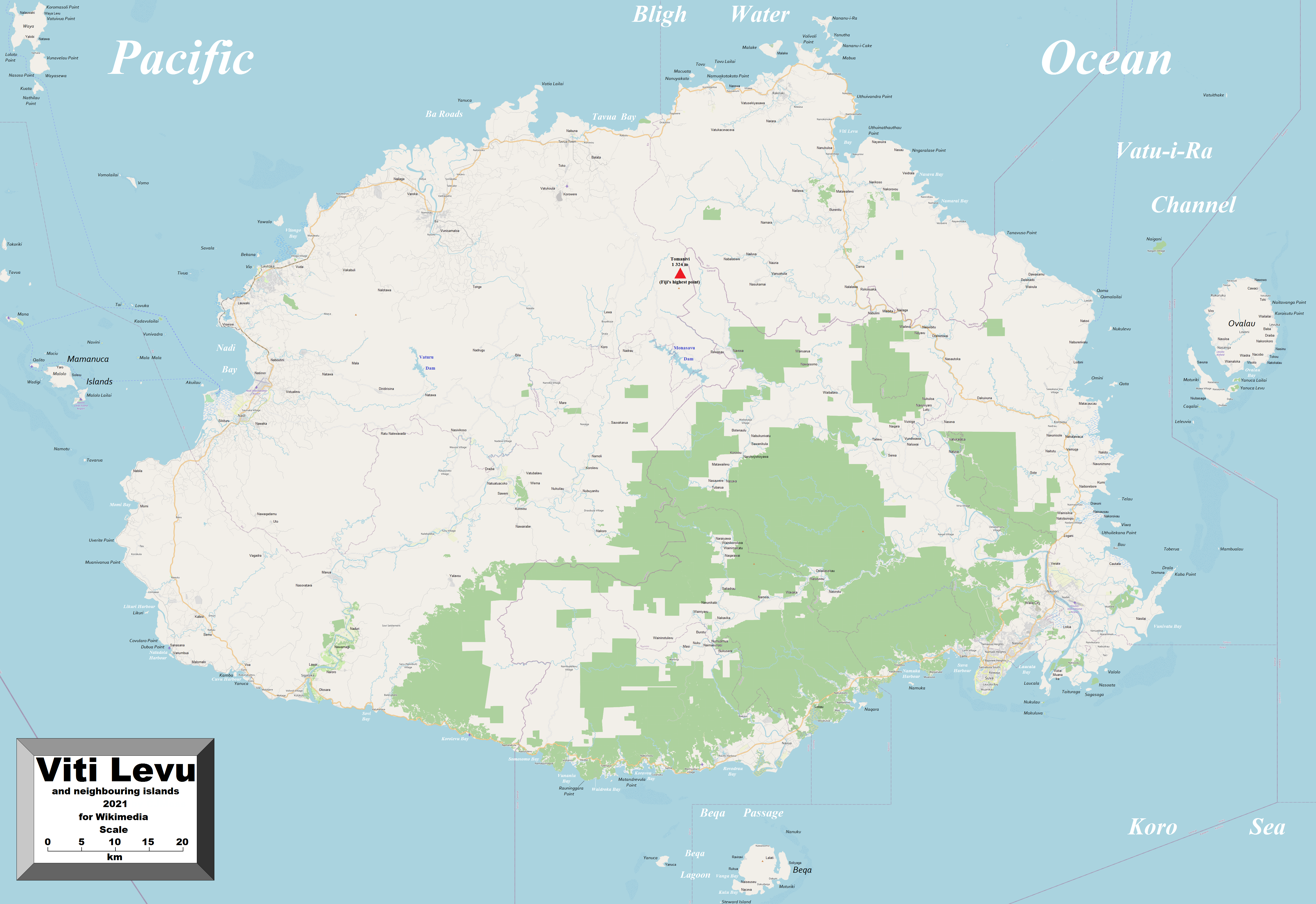
Enlargeable, detailed map of Viti Levu and some neighbouring islands.

Viti Levu is the largest island in the Republic of Fiji – home to 70% of the population (about 600,000 people) – and is the hub of the entire Fijian archipelago. It measures 146 kilometres (91 mi) long and 106 kilometres (66 mi) wide, and has an area of 10,389 square kilometres (4,011 sq mi). Earthquakes and volcanic eruptions account for the somewhat rugged terrain of the island, which is divided into roughly equal halves by a mountain range that runs north to south. The centre of the island is forested and includes the nation's highest peak Mount Tomanivi (otherwise known as Mount Victoria), which rises to 1,324 metres (4,344 ft).

The eastern side of the island experiences heavy rainfall, particularly in the mountains, and is home to Fiji's tropical moist forests. The western side (colloquially called the "burning west") is in the mountain range's rain shadow and is noticeably drier; it is home to Fiji's tropical dry forests. Accordingly, sugar cane production thrives in the west, while a dairy industry is being developed in the east. Fiji's largest cattle ranch, with 7000 head of cattle on 70 square kilometres (17,000 acres), is in Yaqara, midway between Tavua and Rakiraki. The island of Viti Levu is the only known home of one of the world's largest insects, the Giant Fijian long-horned beetle.

The island is susceptible to the effects of climate change. It is estimated that the compound effects of sea level rise and storm surge may result in a temporary relocation of a relatively high numbers of the inhabitants of Viti Levu, predominantly the northern and western parts, with an exposure of up to 6.75% of the islands' population in the future.

== Localities ==
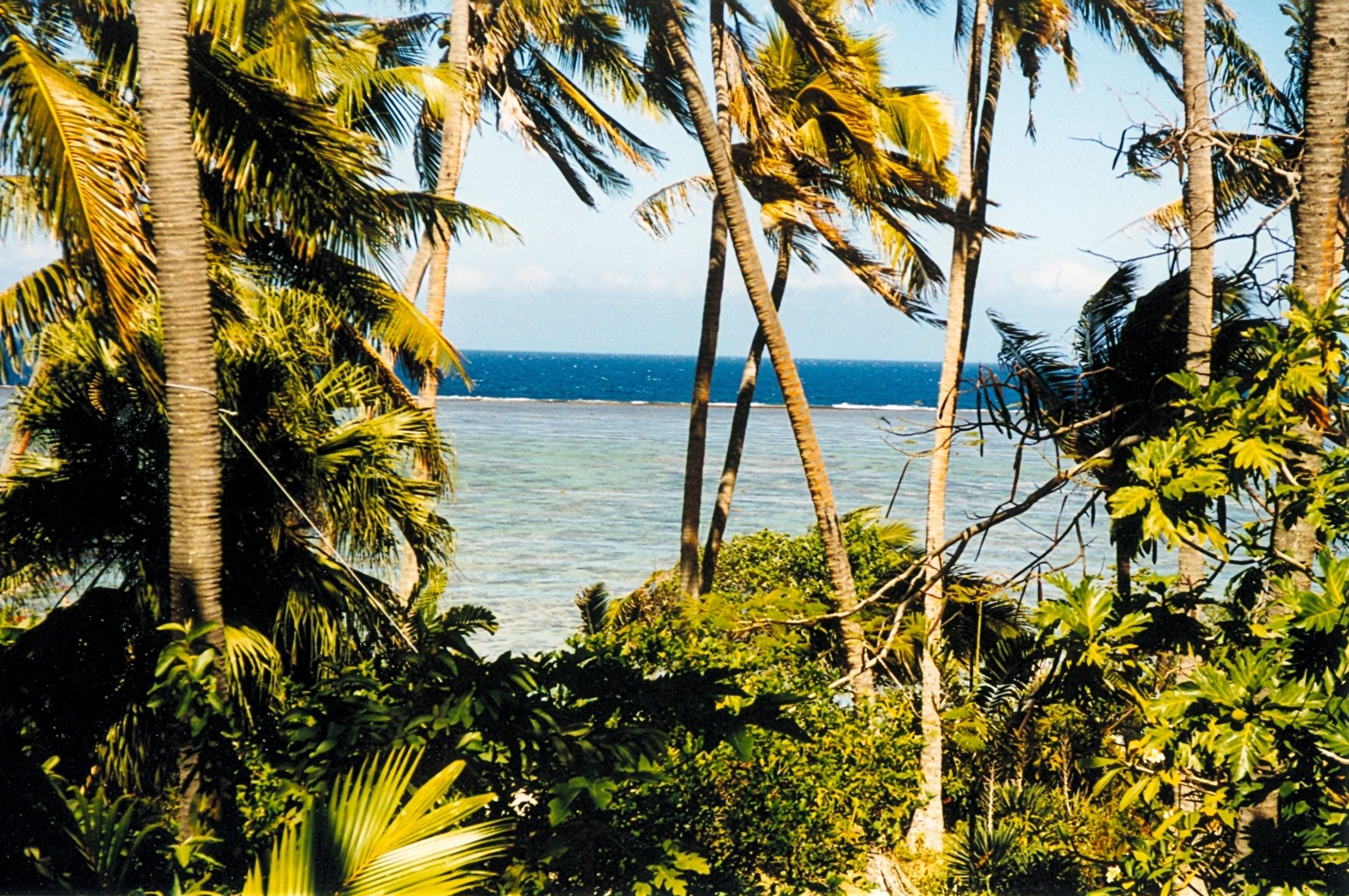
Korotogo beach, Coral Coast.

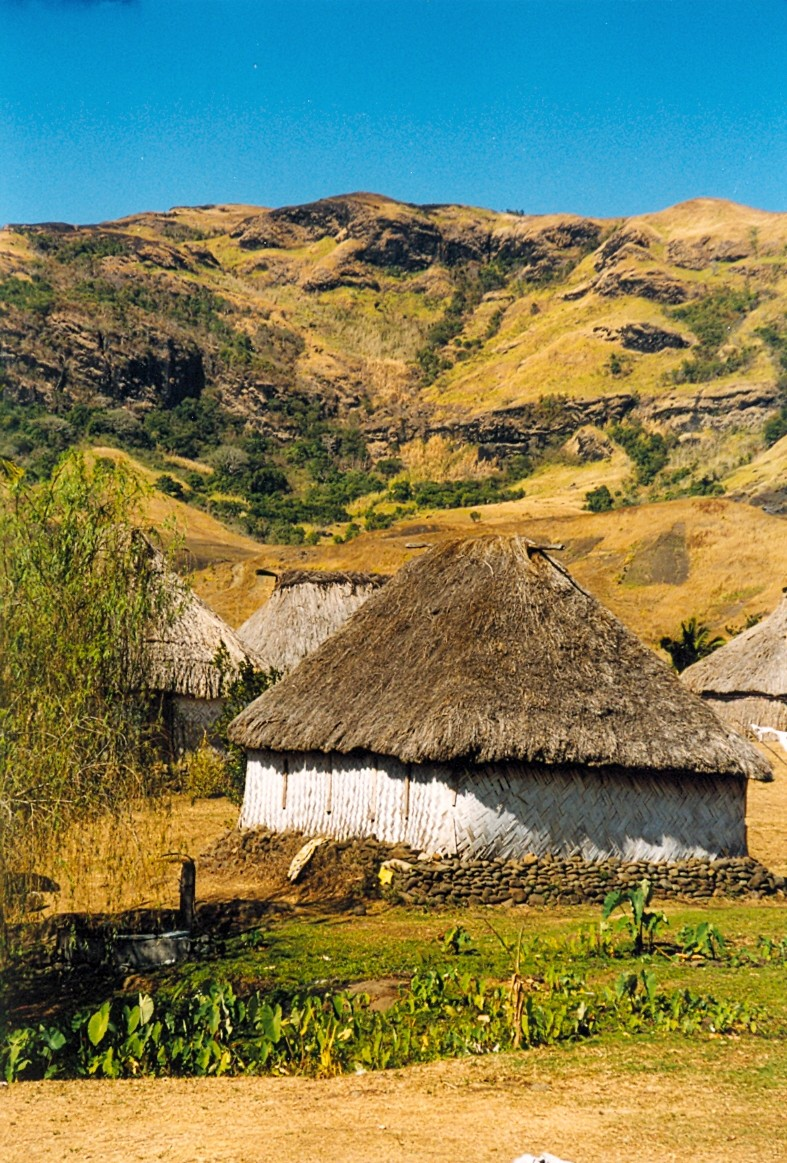
The highland village of Navala.

Viti Levu is home to the capital city of Suva, and to nearly three quarters of the population of the Republic of Fiji (about 580,000 people). Other important towns and cities, which are spread out all along the coast, include Ba, Lautoka, Nadi, Nausori, Rakiraki, and Sigatoka. Two other well-known localities are Natadola Beach in Natadola (a luxurious Intercontinental Fiji Golf Resort and Spa & boutique accommodation at Natadola Beach Resort & Yatule Beach Resort), and Pacific Harbour (a resort centre about 50 kilometers from Suva). A single major road runs around the perimeter of Viti Levu.

== Politics ==
Eight of Fiji's fourteen Provinces are in Viti Levu. The Provinces of Ba, Nadroga-Navosa, and Ra comprise the Western Division, while Naitasiri, Namosi, Rewa, Serua, and Tailevu form the Central Division. The political dynamics of western Viti Levu are somewhat different from those of eastern Viti Levu, in part because western Vitu Levu has a high concentration of Indo-Fijians (many of whose ancestors came to the island from India as indentured workers between 1879 and 1916), whereas eastern Viti Levu has a high concentration of indigenous Fijians (except in its urban areas, which are more racially diverse).

== History ==
=== Prehistory ===
Viti Levu is believed to have been inhabited longer than the island of Vanua Levu, which lies to its north. According to oral tradition, the first Melanesian settlers landed at Vuda Point and established Viseisei as Fiji's first oldest settlement. There is archaeological evidence contradicting this account.

== Transportation ==
Ferry service, provided by the Patterson Brothers Shipping Company, connects Viti Levu to the rest of the islands.

Nadi International Airport, on the island's northwest side, is the principal airport in Fiji. Nausori International Airport, on the southeast side, serves the city of Suva. It has service from 3 domestic commercial passenger airlines.
