= Index of Fiji-related articles =

Articles (arranged alphabetically) about people, places, things, and concepts related to or originating from Fiji, include:

== 0-9 ==
- 2day FM
- 3G

=== 19th century ===
- 1840 Fiji expedition
- 1855 Fiji expedition
- 1858 Fiji expedition

=== 1950s ===
- 1953 Suva earthquake

=== 1960s ===
- 1963 South Pacific Games
- 1964 Fiji rugby union tour of Europe and Canada
- 1968 New Zealand rugby union tour of Australia and Fiji
- 1969 Wales rugby union tour

=== 1970s ===
- 1972 Australia rugby union tour of New Zealand and Fiji
- 1973 England rugby union tour of Fiji and New Zealand
- 1974 Fiji rugby union tour of New Zealand
- 1974 New Zealand rugby union tour of Australia and Fiji
- 1976 Fiji rugby union tour of Australia
- 1976 Ireland rugby union tour of New Zealand and Fiji
- 1977 British Lions tour to New Zealand
- 1979 England rugby union tour of Japan, Fiji and Tonga
- 1979 France rugby union tour of Fiji and New Zealand
- 1979 New Zealand rugby union tour of Australia
- 1979 South Pacific Games

=== 1980s ===
- 1980 Australia rugby union tour of Fiji
- 1980 Fiji rugby union tour of Argentina
- 1980 Fiji rugby union tour of New Zealand
- 1980 Italy rugby union tour of the United States, New Zealand and the South Pacific
- 1980 New Zealand rugby union tour of Australia and Fiji
- 1980 OFC U-20 Championship
- 1982 Fiji rugby union tour of Great Britain and Canada
- 1982 Pacific Tri-Nations
- 1984 Australia rugby union tour of Fiji
- 1984 Fiji rugby union tour of Australia
- 1984 New Zealand rugby union tour of Fiji
- 1985 Fiji rugby union tour of Australia
- 1985 Fiji rugby union tour of British Isles
- 1986 Wales rugby union tour of the South Pacific
- 1988 England rugby union tour of Australia and Fiji
- 1988 OFC U-20 Championship
- 1989 Fiji rugby union tour in Southern Hemisphere
- 1989 Fiji rugby union tour of Europe
- 1989 Melanesia Cup

=== 1990s ===
- 1990 Fiji rugby union tour of Hong Kong and France
- 1990 Oceania Athletics Championships
- 1990 OFC U-20 Championship
- 1991 England rugby union tour of Australia and Fiji
- 1993 Scotland rugby union tour of the South Pacific
- 1994 OFC U-20 Championship
- 1994 Pacific Cup
- 1994 Wales rugby union tour
- 1995 Canada rugby union tour of Fiji and New Zealand
- 1995 Fiji rugby union tour of Wales and Ireland
- 1996 Fiji rugby union tour of Hong Kong
- 1996 Fiji rugby union tour of New Zealand and South Africa
- 1996 Great Britain Lions tour
- 1997 Fiji rugby union tour of New Zealand
- 1997 Oceania Youth Athletics Championships
- 1998 France rugby union tour of Argentina and Fiji
- 1998 Scotland rugby union tour of Oceania
- 1999 Oceania Club Championship

=== 2000s ===
- 2000 Italy rugby union tour
- 2001 Fiji rugby union tour of Italy and France
- 2002 Fiji rugby union tour of British Isles
- 2000 Melanesia Cup
- 2001 EAP Under-19 Cricket Trophy
- 2001 Melanesian Championships in Athletics
- 2002 OFC U-20 Championship
- 2003 Fiji rugby union tours
- 2003 South Pacific Games
- 2004 Oceania Swimming Championships
- 2004 OFC Women's Olympic Qualifying Tournament
- 2004 Pacific Islanders rugby union tour
- 2005 Fiji rugby union tour of Europe
- 2006 in Fiji
- 2006 Italy rugby union tour
- 2006 Pacific Islanders rugby union tour
- 2007 Colonial Cup
- 2007 in Fiji
- 2007 IRB Pacific Nations Cup
- 2008 IRB Pacific Nations Cup
- 2008 Oceanian Futsal Championship
- 2008 OFC Men's Olympic Football Tournament
- 2008 Pacific Islanders rugby union tour of Europe
- 2009 Oceanian Futsal Championship
- 2009 Pacific Cup
- 2009 IRB Pacific Nations Cup

=== 2010s ===
- 2010 Oceanian Futsal Championship
- 2010 IRB Pacific Nations Cup
- 2010 Pacific Rugby Cup
- 2011 in Fijian football
- 2011 Oceanian Futsal Championship
- 2011 IRB Pacific Nations Cup
- 2011 Pacific Rugby Cup
- 2012 Fiji floods (January)
- 2012 IRB Pacific Nations Cup
- 2012 Pacific Rugby Cup
- 2012 Scotland rugby union tour of Australia, Fiji and Samoa
- 2013 end-of-year rugby union internationals
- 2013 International Rugby Union matches
- 2013 IRB Pacific Nations Cup
- 2013 Oceania Sevens Championship
- 2013 OFC U-20 Championship
- 2013–14 OFC Champions League
- 2013 Pacific Rugby Cup
- 2014 end-of-year rugby union internationals
- 2014 Fiji National Football League
- 2014 Hayne/Mannah Cup
- 2014 in Fiji
- 2014 IRB Pacific Nations Cup
- 2014 OFC U-20 Championship
- 2014–15 OFC Champions League
- 2014 Pacific Rugby Cup
- 2015 World Rugby Pacific Challenge
- 2015 World Rugby Pacific Nations Cup

== A ==
- Acacia mathuataensis
- Acolastodes
- Rodney Acraman
- Acritocera negligens
- Acsmithia vitiense
- Adi
- Adi Cakobau School
- Adi Da
- James Ah Koy
- Rachel Ah Koy
- Gaffar Ahmed
- Colin Aikman
- Air Fiji
- Air Pacific destinations
- Airlines of Fiji, list of
- Airlines of Oceania, list of
- Airports by ICAO code: N, list of
- Airports in Fiji, list of
- Rosy Akbar
- Shamima Ali
- Danielle Alakija
- Allanshaw
- William Allardyce
- Allanshaw (ship)
- Albert Park
- Alliance Party
- All Nationals Congress
- Alsmithia
- Anacondas: The Hunt for the Blood Orchid
- Charles Freer Andrews
- Angustalius malacellus
- Felix M. ANTHONY
- ANZ (Fiji)
- ANZ National Stadium
- Appeal Court
- Harry Apted
- William Apted
- Aquaculture in Fiji
- Argo (1800)
- Argyrogramma signata
- Kaminieli Aria
- Armed Forces (Fiji)
- Arno (ship)
- Arya Pratinidhi Sabha of Fiji
- Arya Samaj in Fiji
- Arya Pratinidhi Sabha of Fiji
- Assembly of Christian Churches in Fiji
- Attorney-General (Fiji)
- Atu
- Atuna elliptica
- Australia-Fiji relations
- Avengers of the Reef
- Alvin Avinesh
- Avon (ship)
- Azure-crested flycatcher

=== Aglaia ===
- Aglaia amplexicaulis
- Aglaia archboldiana
- Aglaia basiphylla
- Aglaia evansensis
- Aglaia gracilis
- Aglaia fragilis
- Aglaia unifolia
- Aglaia vitiensis

=== Ali ===
- Ahmed Ali
- Amjad Ali
- Joy Ali
- Junior Farzan Ali

=== Astronidium ===
- Astronidium degeneri
- Astronidium floribundum
- Astronidium inflatum
- Astronidium kasiense
- Astronidium lepidotum
- Astronidium macranthum
- Astronidium pallidiflorum
- Astronidium robustum
- Astronidium saulae
- Astronidium storckii
- Astronidium tomentosum
- Astronidium victoriae

=== Athletics ===
- Athletics at the 1963 South Pacific Games
- Athletics at the 1979 South Pacific Games
- Athletics at the 2003 South Pacific Games
- Athletics Fiji

== B ==
- Ba District
- Ba F.C.
- Ba Province
- Ba River
- Ba Town
- Jale Baba
- Tupeni Baba
- Anand Babla
- Seremaia Bai
- Atu Emberson Bain
- Frank Bainimarama
- Ratu Meli BAINIMARAMA
- Thomas BAKER
- Parveen Bala
- Mark BALDWIN
- Qoriniasi Bale
- Aminio Baledrokadroka
- Jone Baledrokadroka
- Pita Baleitoga
- Matila Balekana
- Panapasa Balekana
- Ballin
- Banaba
- Bangladesh-Fiji relations
- Joji Banuve
- Barking imperial pigeon
- Tia Barrett
- Sir Cecil BARTON
- Bar-winged rail
- Bati
- Iliseva Batibasaga
- Batiki
- Makelesi Batimala
- Battle of the Giants
- Battle of Kaba
- Bau District
- Bau Fijian
- Bau Island
- Solomone Bauserau
- Timoci Bavadra
- Bayard (ship)
- Hodgy Beats
- Bryan Beaumont
- Mick Beddoes
- Nadira Begg
- William J. Belcher
- Beqa
- Berar (Ship)
- Henry Spencer Berkeley
- Bete
- Sharon Bhagwan-Rolls
- Ahmed Bhamji
- Hiren Bhartu
- Veena Bhatnagar
- Bhawani Dayal Arya College
- BIG MAGIC
- Birds of Fiji, list of
- Blackbirding
- Waqa Blake
- Peter Blanchard
- Blastobasis lososi
- Bligh Roosters
- Bligh Water
- Alexander BLOKHIN
- Sireli Bobo
- Boda River
- Bodybuilding in Fiji
- Meli Bogileka
- Mosese Bogisa
- Ratu Ovini BOKINI
- Asaeli Boko
- Kelemedi Bola
- Samu Bola
- James Bolabiu
- Jimi Bolakoro
- Filimoni Bolavucu
- Filipe Bole
- Ratu Meli BOLOBOLO
- Boot Camp
- Bose Levu Vakaturaga
- Peni Botiki
- Botyodes asialis
- Derek Boyer
- Boyne (1877 ship)
- Nick Bradley-Qalilawa
- Brachylophus
- Brachylophus bulabula
- Inoke Breckterfield
- Gerard Brennan
- British currency in Oceania
- British Peer (ship)
- Richard Broadbridge
- George BROWN
- Joseph BROWNE
- Bruce (ship)
- Jabez Bryce
- Bua
- Bua F.C.
- Bua River
- Matelita Buadromo
- Virisila Buadromo
- Vitori Buatava
- Buca Bay
- Buca River
- Bucaisau River
- Buivaroro
- Buke Levu, Mount
- Mirza Namrud Buksh
- M. S. Buksh
- Jayson Bukuya
- I. L. Bula
- Bula FM
- Bula Quo!
- Kevueli Bulamainaivalu
- Mitieli Bulanauca
- Bulbul tarang
- Kelemedi Bulewa
- Sakiusa Bulicokocoko
- Bulou
- Bulu
- Joeli Bulu
- Che Bunce
- Poseci Bune
- Bure
- Burebasaga Confederacy
- Burotu
- Seremaia Burotu
- Sydney Charles BURT
- Sakeasi Butadroka
- Trevor Butler
- Juan Carlos Buzzetti

=== Balaka ===
- Balaka longirostris
- Balaka macrocarpa
- Balaka microcarpa
- Balaka pauciflora
- Balaka seemannii
- Balaka streptostachys

== C ==
- Cabinet of Fiji
- Tabua Cakacaka
- Setefano Cakau
- Cakaudrove
- Caloptilia hercoscelis
- Caloptilia soyella
- Junior Tomasi Cama
- Tomasi Cama
- Camakau
- Reagan Campbell-Gillard
- Alipate Carlile
- Carpenter's Tower, Fiji
- Maurice CASEY
- Cast Away
- Castaway Island
- Geoffrey Caston
- Adi Asenaca CAUCAU
- Rupeni Caucaunibuca
- Bill Cavubati
- Tevita Cavubati
- Viliame Cavubati
- Orisi Cavuilati
- Joeli Cawaki
- Central Division
- Coastal Stallions
- Ceva-i-Ra
- Chairman of the Great Council of Chiefs
- Nathaniel Chalmers
- Champion versus Champion
- Charlie Charters
- Mahendra Chaudhry
- Chenab (ship)
- Chief Justice (Fiji)
- Chief Magistrate (Fiji)
- Chief Minister (Fiji)
- China-Fiji relations
- Chinese in Fiji
- Christian Democratic Alliance (Fiji)
- David Ariu Christopher
- Churchill Park (Lautoka)
- Cibaciba and Drakulu
- Cibi
- Cicia
- Cicia Airport
- Cities and towns in Fiji, list of
- Citizens' Constitutional Forum
- Civil Aviation Authority of Fiji
- Petero Civoniceva
- Fielding Clarke
- Clinostigma exorrhizum
- Clyde (ship)
- Coastal Stallions
- Cobia Island
- Coins of the Fijian dollar
- Coins of the Fijian pound
- Ratu Tu'uakitau COKANAUTO
- Joketani Cokanasiga
- Collared lory
- John COLLINS
- Colo Wars
- Colo-i-Suva Forest Reserve
- Colonial Cup
- Colonial Sugar Refining Company (Fiji)
- Colonial War Memorial Hospital
- Colonial Fiji
- Commissioner of Police (Fiji)
- Commonwealth Pacific Cable System
- Communal constituencies
- Communications in Fiji
- Condica conducta
- Confederation of Public Sector Unions
- Constituency Boundaries Commission
- Conus alexandrei
- Conway Reef
- Robin COOKE
- Leslie COPELAND
- Coqeloa
- Coral Coast
- Dan Costello Snr
- Daniel Rae Costello
- Council of Rotuma
- Counter Revolutionary Warfare Unit
- Court of Appeal
- Cricket at the 2003 South Pacific Games
- Crimson shining parrot
- Ron Crocombe
- Cuba–Oceania relations
- Culture of Fiji
- Curu Mai
- Paulini Curuenavuli
- Cynometra falcata
- Cynometra insularis
- Cyphosperma tanga
- Cyphosperma trichospadix
- Cytaea koronivia
- Cytaea nausori
- Cytaea vitiensis

=== Cakobau ===
- Ratu Sir Edward CAKOBAU
- Ratu Epenisa CAKOBAU
- Ratu George CAKOBAU
- Ratu Sir George CAKOBAU
- Adi Litia CAKOBAU
- Ratu Seru Epenisa CAKOBAU
- Adi Samanunu CAKOBAU-TALAKULI

=== Chand ===
- Ami Chand
- Dewan Chand
- Dinesh Chand
- Ganesh Chand
- Pramod Chand
- Pratap Chand
- Vijay Chand

=== Chandra ===
- Ami Chandra
- Baba Ram Chandra
- Rajesh Chandra

=== Constitution of Fiji ===
- Constitution of Fiji
  - 1970 Constitution
  - 1990 Constitution
  - 1997 Constitution (main article)
    - Preamble
    - Chapters 1
    - 2
    - 3
    - 4
    - 5
    - 6
    - 7
    - 8
    - 9
    - 10
    - 11
    - 12
    - 13
    - 14
    - 15
    - 16
    - 17
  - 2013 Constitution

=== Cyclone ===
- Cyclone Ami
- Cyclone Bola
- Cyclone Cilla
- Cyclone Cliff
- Cyclone Bebe
- Cyclone Daman
- Cyclone Eric
- Cyclone Evan
- Cyclone Fran
- Cyclone Gavin
- Cyclone Gene
- Cyclone Ian
- Cyclone Keli
- Cyclone Kina
- Cyclone Lusi
- Cyclone Mick
- Cyclone Nigel
- Cyclone Zoe
- Cyclone Wilma
- Cyclone Vania
- Cyclone Tomas
- Cyclone Oli
- Cyclone Paula
- Cyclone Susan
- Cyclone Tam (2006)
- Cyclone Tomas

== D ==
- Dacrycarpus imbricatus
- Daewoo Precision Industries K2
- Daily Post (Fiji)
- Keni Dakuidreketi
- Joe Dakuitoga
- Dakuwaqa
- Dama River (Fiji)
- Dance in Rotuma
- Danube (ship)
- Quazi Golam Dastgir
- Daucina
- Jone Daunivucu
- Waisea Daveta
- Samuela Davetawalu
- Vilimaina Davu
- Davuilevu
- Dawacumu River
- Dawasamu River
- Daylight saving time in Fiji
- Noor Dean
- Deans Trophy
- Degei
- Apisalome Degei
- Degeneriaceae
- Jone Delai
- Delailoa
- Nelson Delailomaloma
- Iliesa Delana
- Vilimoni Delasau
- Demographics of Fiji
- Denarau Island
- Roshika Deo
- Vishnu Deo
- Andrew Deoki
- Ram Narayan Deoki
- Deorbit of Mir
- Derek Derenalagi
- James Herman De Ricci
- Desmethoxyyangonin
- Sir William DES VŒUX
- Deuba River
- DEUCE
- Graham Dewes
- Dhantal
- Digicel Cup
- Dihydrokavain
- Dihydromethysticin
- Ratu Josefa DIMURI
- Larry Miles Dinger
- Diospyros fasciculosa
- Diplomatic missions in Fiji, list of
- Diplomatic missions of Fiji, list of
- Diplomatic relations of Fiji
- Director of Public Prosecutions (Fiji)
- Iowane Divavesi
- Manoa Dobui
- Manilal Doctor
- Dodonu ni Taukei
- Keni Doidoi
- Vyacheslav Dolgov
- Dominion of Fiji
- Isoa Domolailai
- Sam Domoni
- William Earnest Donnelly
- Alifereti Doviverata
- Brian Andre Doyle
- Drakaniwai River
- Dranivia
- Misaele Draunibaka
- Savenaca Draunidalo
- Tupou Draunidalo
- Dravuni
- Drawa River
- Dreketi F.C.
- Dreketi River
- Pita Driti
- Asaeli Driu
- Moses Driver
- Ema Druavesi
- Hannah Dudley
- Dudley High School
- Alfred DUFTY
- Colin Dufty
- Francis Herbert Dufty
- Maciu Dunadamu
- Shanti Dut
- Yogendra Dutt
- Iliesa Duvuloco
- Lagi Dyer
- Adi Senimili DYER

== E ==
- East Fijian languages
- Eastern Division
- Fred J. Eckert
- Economy of Fiji
- Lorna Eden
- Thomas Eichelbaum
- Chandra Ekanayake
- Paul Elaisa
- Elbe (ship)
- Electoral system of Fiji
- Rob Elder
- Ems (ship)
- Eori
- Pene Erenio
- Albert Ehrhardt
- Erne (ship)
- Essential National Industries (Employment) Decree 2011
- Eublemma anachoresis
- European Union, Fiji Mission to
- Arthur Eustace
- Ivor EVANS
- Kane Evans
- Excite Truck
- Excitebots: Trick Racing
- Executive Council (Fiji)

=== Elections ===
Main article: Elections in Fiji (List) Separate articles:

1963
- 1966
- 1968 (byelections)
- 1972
- March 1977
- September 1977
- 1982
- 1987
- 1992
- 1994
- 1999
- 2001
- 2006
- 2014

== F ==
- .fj
- Fagraea gracilipes
- Fakpure
- John Neil FALVEY
- Famous Fijians
- Fara (Rotuman festivity)
- Fazilka (ship)
- FBC TV
- Federal Council of Australasia
- Federation of Cane Growers
- Festivals in Fiji
- Maurice Fenn
- Ficus obliqua
- Peni Finau
- Flag of Fiji
- Flaming Teeth
- Flavokavain
- Flavokavain A
- Flavokavain B
- Flavokavain C
- FM96
- Arthur FLETCHER
- Flora and fauna of Fiji
- Football at the 1963 South Pacific Games
- Football at the 1979 South Pacific Games
- Football in Fiji
- Football clubs in Fiji, list of
- Anthony Ford
- Foreign Ministers of Fiji
- Foreign relations of Fiji
- Charles Rossiter Forwood
- Fossiliferous stratigraphic units in Fiji, list of
- Peter Foster
- Sir Robert Sidney FOSTER
- Kenneth Franzheim II
- Bernie FRASER
- Brooke Fraser
- Robert French
- Sir Brian FREESTON
- Ngaire Fuata
- Fulaga
- Fultala (ship)
- Fulton College
- Don Furner
- Futsal in Fiji

=== Fatiaki ===
- Daniel Fatiaki
- Fred Fatiaki
- John Fatiaki
- Ravai Fatiaki
- Sarafu Fatiaki

=== Fiji ===
- Fiji Airways
- Fiji Association of Sports and National Olympic Committee
- Fiji and the United Nations
- Fiji at the Empire and Commonwealth Games
  - 1938
  - 1950
  - 1954
  - 1958
  - 1962
  - 1974
  - 1978
  - 1982
  - 2006
  - 2014
- Fiji at the Olympics
  - 1956
  - 1960
  - 1968
  - 1972
  - 1976
  - Fiji at the 1984 Summer Olympics
  - 1988
  - 1988 (Winter Olympics)
  - 1992
  - 1994 (Winter Olympics)
  - 1996
  - 2000
  - 2002 (Winter Olympics)
  - 2004
  - Fiji at the 2008 Summer Olympics
  - 2010 (Youth Olympics)
  - Fiji at the 2012 Summer Olympics
  - Fiji at the 2016 Summer Olympics
- Fiji at the Paralympics
  - 1964
  - 1976
  - 1996
  - 2000
  - 2004
  - 2008
  - 2012 (Paralympics)
- Fiji at the 2011 Pacific Games
- Fiji at the 2009 World Championships in Athletics
- Fiji at the 2011 World Championships in Athletics
- Fiji at the 2013 World Aquatics Championships
- Fiji at the 2013 World Championships in Athletics
- Fiji at the 2014 Summer Youth Olympics
- Fiji at the 2015 Pacific Games
- Fiji at the Rugby World Cup
- Fiji banded iguana
- Fiji Barbarians
- Fiji Bitter
- Fiji Broadcasting Corporation
- Fiji bush warbler
- Fiji Cane Growers Association
- Fiji Chess Federation
- Fiji Commerce Commission
- Fiji Constitutional Crisis of 1977
- Fiji Constitutional Crisis of 2009
- Fiji crested iguana
- Fiji Cycling Association
- Fiji Davis Cup team
- Fiji Democratic Party
- Fiji Fashion Week
- Fiji Fed Cup team
- Fiji Financial Intelligence Unit
- FijiFirst
- Fiji Focus
- Fiji Football Association
- Fiji Football Association Cup Tournament
- Fiji Football Association Cup Tournament
- Fiji Football Referees Association
- Fiji–France Maritime Delimitation Agreement
- Fiji-France relations
- Fiji Girl Guides Association
- Fiji goshawk
- Fiji Hindi
- Fiji Human Rights Commission
- Fiji Independence Medal
- Fiji Independent Commission Against Corruption
- Fiji-India relations
- Fiji Indian
- Fiji Indian National Congress
- Fiji Indian organisations
- Fiji-Indonesia relations
- Fiji Infantry Regiment
- Fiji Institute of Technology
- Fiji Intelligence Services
- Fiji International
- Fiji Islands Council of Trade Unions
- Fiji Labour Party
- Fiji Law Reform Commission
- Fiji Law Society
- Fiji Live
- Fiji-Malaysia relations
- Fiji men's national field hockey team
- Fiji men's national volleyball team
- Fiji Meteorological Service
- Fiji Museum
- Fiji Muslim League
- Fiji national basketball team
- Fiji national beach soccer team
- Fiji national football team results
- Fiji national futsal team
- Fiji national netball team
- Fiji National Rugby League
- Fiji National Rugby League Competition
- Fiji national rugby league team
- Fiji national rugby union players, list of
- Fiji national rugby union team
- Fiji national cricket team
- Fiji national football team
- Fiji national under-17 football team
- Fiji national under-19 cricket team
- Fiji national under-20 football team
- Fiji national under-20 rugby union team
- Fiji National University
- Fiji Native Tribal Congress
- Fiji-New Zealand relations
- Fiji One
- Fiji parrotfinch
- Fiji petrel
- Fiji Rugby Union
- Fiji-Russia relations
- Fiji Samachar
- Fiji Sanatan Society of Alberta
- Fiji School of Medicine
- Fiji Scouts Association
- Fiji snake
- Fiji-Solomon Islands relations
- Fiji-South Korea relations
- Fiji Sports Council
- Fiji Sugar Corporation
- Fiji Sun
- Fiji Television
- Fiji Times
- Fiji-Tonga relations
- Fiji Trades Union Congress
- Fiji tropical dry forests
- Fiji tropical moist forests
- Fiji-Tuvalu relations
- Fiji United Freedom Party
- Fiji-United States relations
- Fiji Village
- Fiji Warriors
- Fiji water
- Fiji Week
- Fiji Week, 2004
- Fiji Week, 2005
- Fiji whistler
- Fiji white-eye
- Fiji Women's Crisis Centre
- Fiji women's national basketball team
- Fiji women's national football team
- Fiji women's national rugby union team

=== Fijian, Fijians ===
- Fijian Affairs Ministers (list)
- (Fijian) Alliance Party
- Fijian American
- Fijian Association
- Fijian Association Party (FAP)
- Fijian Australian
- Fijian Battalion
- Fijian dollar
- Fijian electoral system
- Fijian food
- Fijian Football League
- Fijian honours system
- Fijian Indian diaspora
- Fijian language
- Fijian mercenaries in Bougainville
- Fijian military unrest in 2006
- Fijian monkey-faced bat
- Fijian naming conventions
- Fijian Nationalist Party
- Fijian passport
- Fijian people (ethnic group)
- Fijian politicians, list of
- Fijian records in swimming, list of
- Fijian sportspeople, list of
- Fijian submissions for the Academy Award for Best Foreign Language Film, list of
- Fijian pound
- Fijians in the United Kingdom

=== Fijian coups ===
- Fiji coups of 1987
- Fiji coup of 2000
  - Timeline
  - Mutinies
  - Ratu Mara's removal
  - Trials
  - Court Martial
- Fiji coup of 2006
- Fiji Court of Appeal
- Fiji crisis of 2005-2006
  - Timeline
  - Baledrokadroka incident
  - Reaction
- Fiji coup of 2006

== G ==
- Bill Gadolo
- Gagaja
- Galoa Island
- Galogalo River
- Jonetani Galuinadi
- Ganges (1861)
- Ganges (1882)
- Adi Ateca GANILAU
- Bernadette Ganilau
- Ratu Epeli GANILAU
- Ratu Sir Penaia GANILAU
- Joseph Hector GARRICK
- Sir Ronald GARVEY
- Garvey Park
- Anthony Gates
- Gau Airport
- Gau Island
- Thomas Gault
- Maseikula Gaunavou
- Jai Gawander
- Viliame Gavoka
- Gay rights in Fiji
- Gedi
- Geissois imthurnii
- Geissois stipularis
- Geissois superba
- General electors
- General Voters Party
- Geography of Fiji
- Yash Ghai
- Giant Fijian long-horned beetle
- Giant honeyeater
- Jono Gibbes
- Gilbertese language
- Girl of the Port
- Girmit Heritage Party
- Girmit Soccer Tournament
- Gmelina vitiensis
- God Bless Fiji (National Anthem)
- Gold FM
- Golden dove
- Gone Dau language
- Vereniki Goneva
- Isaia Gonewai
- Fabian Goodall
- Sir John GORRIE
- John GOSLING
- Gunasagaran Gounder
- Navaneeda K. Gounder
- Government Buildings, Suva
- Government House, Suva
- Governors of Fiji (List)
- Governors-General of Fiji (list)
- K. N. Govind
- Govind Park
- Graptophyllum repandum
- Grand Coalition for Fiji
- Grand Pacific Hotel
- Sir Alexander GRANTHAM
- Great Astrolabe Reef
- Great Council of Chiefs (Fiji)
- Michael GREEN
- Ashley Martin GREENWOOD
- Aaron Groom
- Chuck Grotte
- Group Against Racial Discrimination
- Satish Chandra Gulabdas
- Gujaratis in Fiji
- Gurkul Primary School
- Rudi Gutendorf

=== Gardenia ===
- Gardenia anapetes
- Gardenia candida
- Gardenia gordonii
- Gardenia grievei
- Gardenia hutchinsoniana
- Gardenia hillii
- Gardenia storckii

=== Geniostoma ===
- Geniostoma clavigerum
- Geniostoma confertiflorum
- Geniostoma macrophyllum
- Geniostoma stipulare
- Geniostoma uninervium

== H ==
- Sir William HACKETT
- Hạf'liua
- Aaron HALL
- Robert Wilson Hamilton
- Sir Arthur HAMILTON-GORDON
- HASAN, Said
- Hatana
- Hector Hatch
- Epeli Hau'ofa
- Jarryd Hayne
- Head of State of Fiji
- Angie Heffernan
- Trevor Henry
- Hereford (ship)
- Vilsoni Hereniko
- Sathya Hettige
- Scott Higginbotham
- High Commission of Fiji, London
- High commissioners of New Zealand to Fiji, list of
- High commissioners of the United Kingdom to Fiji, list of
- High Court of Fiji
- Nifa and Nishan Hindes
- Hindu Maha Sabha (Fiji)
- Hinduism in Fiji
- His Majesty O'Keefe
- History of Fiji
  - Discovery
  - The rise and fall of Cakobau
  - Colonial Fiji
  - Modern history of Fiji
- History of the Jews in Fiji
- History of rugby union matches between Australia and Fiji
- History of rugby union matches between Fiji and Italy
- History of rugby union matches between Fiji and Samoa
- History of rugby union matches between Fiji and Scotland
- History of rugby union matches between Fiji and Wales
- History of rugby union matches between the British & Irish Lions and other countries
- HMS Conflict (1873)
- A. M. HOCART
- Alex Hodgman
- Selina Hornibrook
- House of Chiefs
- House of Representatives of Fiji
- Housing Authority of Fiji
- Charles Gough Howell
- Mike Howlett
- Howrah (ship)
- Stuart Huggett
- Andrew HUGHES
- Nathan Hughes
- Wally Hughes
- Human trafficking in Fiji
- Fida Hussein
- Azim Hussein
- Sir Eyre HUTSON
- Hydriastele microcarpa

== I ==
- Ratu Josefa ILOILO
- Sir Everard IM THURN
- India-Fiji relations
- Indians in Fiji
- Indus (ship)
- Inocarpus fagifer
- Instant-runoff voting
- Instruments of Independence
- Intelligentsiya (blog)
- Inter-District Championship
- David Ipp
- Imraz Iqbal
- IRB Pacific 5 Nations
- I-sala
- Islam in Fiji
- Islands Business
- Islands of Fiji, list of
- ISO 3166-2:FJ
- Itu'muta
- Itu'ti'u

=== Indian ===
- Indian Association of Fiji
- Indian Cane Growers Association
- Indian Imperial Association
- Indian indenture ships to Fiji
- Indian members of Legislative Council of Fiji
- Indian Platoon
- Indian Reform League

== J ==
- Gerson Jackson
- Sir Henry Moore JACKSON
- Sir Derek JAKEWAY
- Imrana Jalal
- Anare Jale
- Tony Jamieson
- Farouk Janeman
- Ben Jannif
- Ilisavani Jegesa
- Edward Enoch Jenkins
- Arthur JENNINGS
- George JENNINGS
- Michael JENNINGS
- Robert JENNINGS
- Brad Johnstone
- Joske's Thumb
- Judicial Service Commission
- Juju (district)
- Jumna (ship)
- Justice and Freedom Party
- Justice of Appeal

== K ==
- Hosanna Kabakoro
- Kabara
- Glenn Kable
- Kadavu fantail
- Kadavu Group
- Kadavu honeyeater
- Kadavu Island
- Penaia Kadavulevu
- Kaibu
- Simione Kaitani
- Kaivalagi
- Kaiviti
- Sekonaia Kalou
- Atunaisa Kaloumairai
- Kalouyalewa
- Daren Kamali
- Tomasi Kanailagi
- Kanacea
- Kanaka
- Ratu Epeli KANAKANA
- Kanakas
- Malakai Kainihewe
- Mari Kapi
- Kasavu River
- Wise Kativerata
- Kato'aga
- Ratu Aisea KATONIVERE
- Jonetani Kaukimoce
- Kaunitoni
- Malakai Kaunivalu
- Samuela Kautoga
- Kava
- Kava culture
- Kavain
- Kavalactone
- Kavula River
- Adi Salaseini KAVUNONO
- Nemani Kavuru
- Francis Kean
- Freddy Keiaho
- Kenneth Keith
- Declan KELLY
- Nemia Kenatale
- Kendrit Shiri Sanatan Dharam Shiv Temple
- Ro Teimumu KEPA
- Sailosi Kepa
- Iliesa Keresoni
- Samu Kerevi
- Rashit Khamidulin
- Tulsi Ram Khelwan
- Shah KIBRIA
- Lyons Kieran
- Viliame Kikau
- Kingiodendron platycarpum
- Kioa
- Kisan Sangh
- Arthur Kitinas
- Kleinhovia
- Meli Koliavu
- Osea Kolinisau
- George Konrote
- Sevanaia KORO
- Koro Airport
- Koro Island
- Koro-ni-O
- Koro Sea
- Jimi Koroi
- Jokapeci Koroi
- Marika Koroibete
- Kiniviliame Koroibuleka
- Josua Koroibulu
- Semi Koroilavesau
- Apisai Koroisau
- Koroivonu River
- Korolevu River
- Koro-ni-O
- Korotasere River
- Niumaia Korovata
- Lesi Korovavala
- Korovou
- Al Korovou
- Manu Korovulavula
- Korovuli River
- Koroyanitu, Mount
- Sunia Koto
- Joji Kotobalavu
- Faiyaz Koya
- Sidiq Koya
- Nailani KRISHAN
- James Shri Krishna
- Roy Krishna
- Ratu Inoke KUBUABOLA
- Ratu Jone KUBUABOLA
- Sisa Koyamaibole
- Kubuna Confederacy
- Kubuna River
- Kula Eco Park
- Semi Kunatani
- Maleli Kunavore
- Sadhu Kuppuswami
- Jone Kuraduadua
- Chris Kuridrani
- Tevita Kuridrani
- Selina Kuruleca
- Suliasi Kurulo
- Kundan Singh Kush
- Kya Dilli Kya Lahore

=== Khan ===
- A. H. Sahu Khan
- Ballu Khan
- Hafiz Khan
- Iqbal KHAN
- Jahir Khan
- Mohammed Afzal Khan
- M. T. Khan
- Rocky Khan

=== Kumar ===
- Anup KUMAR
- Jain Kumar
- Jainend Kumar
- Jilila Kumar
- Manoj KUMAR
- Nareish Kumar
- Ronil Kumar
- Salesh Kumar

== L ==
- Ratu Paula LACAWAI
- Lagalaga River
- Lahloo
- Aseri Laing
- Lakeba
- Lakeba Airport
- Lakeba River
- B. D. Lakshman
- Chaitanya Lakshman
- Prince Gopal Lakshman
- Ratu Naiqama LALABALAVU
- Lali (drum)
- Lapitiguana
- Fero Lasagavibau
- Josefa Lasagavibau
- Lascars in Fiji
- Laucala
- Laucala Airport
- LAUFITU of Tonga
- Lau Islands
- Lauan language
- Sanivalati Laulau
- Lauwaki
- Lava Cola
- Lawaki River
- Lawaqa Park
- Leader of the Opposition
- Kele Leawere
- Sireli Ledua
- Legend FM
- Legislative Council (Fiji)
- Michael Leitch
- Lekutu River
- Charles Oswald Lelean
- Lelean Memorial School
- Leleuvia
- Leonidas (ship)
- Lepidoptera of Fiji, list of
- Ponipate Lesavua
- Lethacotyle fijiensis
- Graeme Leung
- Josefa Levula
- Levuka
- Levuka Airfield
- Levuka F.C.
- Lewalevu
- Wame Lewaravu
- Neumi Leweni
- Isireli Leweniqila
- LGBT history in Fiji
- LGBT rights in Fiji
- Norman Ligairi
- Maria Liku
- Maca Likutabua
- Lio 'On Famör Rotuma Party
- Lawrence Little
- Nicky Little
- Lobau River
- Local government of Fiji
- Eroni Loganimoce
- Isoa Logavatu
- Jacob Loko
- Lomaiviti
- Lomaiviti language
- Lomaloma
- Long-legged warbler
- Watisone Lotawa
- Gabrielle LOVOBALAVU
- Lovoni
- Lovoni River
- Kenneth Low
- Alexander Losyukov
- Felix von Luckner
- Sir Harry LUKE
- Vika Lusibaea
- Lutukina River
- Lutunasobasoba
- Mosese Luveitasau
- Jiko Luveni
- Waisea Luveniyali

=== Labasa ===
- Labasa
- Labasa Airport
- Labasa College
- Labasa F.C.
- Labasa Kisan Sangh
- Labasa River

=== Lal ===
- Brij Lal (historian)
- Brij LAL (politician)
- John Icha Lal
- Prerna Lal
- Surendra Lal

=== Lami ===
- Lami
- Lami F.C.
- Lami River

=== Lautoka ===
- Lautoka
- Lautoka District
- Lautoka F.C.

== M ==
- Campese Ma'afu
- Enele Ma'afu
- Salesi Ma'afu
- Jone Macilai (rugby league)
- Jone Macilai-Tori
- Macuata
- Sir Kenneth MADDOCKS
- James Madhavan
- Siromaniam MADHAVAN
- Ratu Joni MADRAIWIWI
- Ratu Joni MADRAIWIWI I
- Magimagi
- Mago Island
- Maha Sangh
- Mahatma Gandhi Memorial High School (Fiji)
- Mai TV
- Main (1884 ship)
- Ratu Kinijoji MAIVALILI
- Sir Charles MAJOR
- Mak Sa'moa
- Mak Sa'moa
- Makogai
- Malakua River
- David Malcolm
- Inoke Male
- Malhaha
- Malolo
- Malolo Lailai
- Malolo Lailai Airport
- Malumu NAIVAUKURA
- Mamanuca Islands
- Mammals of Fiji, list of
- Mana Island Airport
- Injimo Managreve
- Maniltoa floribunda
- Maniltoa minor
- Maniltoa vestita
- Craig K. Manscill
- A. R. Manu
- Deacon Manu
- Paul Manueli
- Daniel Urai Manufolau
- Adi Litiana MAOPA
- Maps of Fiji
- Maqewa
- Samuela Marayawa
- Adrian Mariappa
- Saleem Marsoof
- Marist Brothers High School (Fiji)
- Mary Jane's Relaxing Soda
- Maseikula
- Manoa Masi
- Asaeli Masilaca
- Masked shining parrot
- Esala Masi
- Benito Masilevu
- Anthony MASON
- Keith MASON
- Master of the High Court
- Petero Mataca
- Sakiusa Matadigo
- Matagi
- Mataika House
- Matailobau District
- Irami Matairavula
- Isikeli Mataitoga
- Roger Matakamikamica
- Samuela Matakibau
- Timoci Matanavou
- Naomi Matanitobua
- Ratu Suliano MATANITOBUA
- Matanivanua
- Mataniwai River
- Mataqali
- Josh Matavesi
- Matawalu
- Nikola Matawalu
- Matei Airport
- Josua Mateinaniu
- Matuku
- Maunatul Islam Association of Fiji
- Neil Maxwell
- Maxwell Hendry Maxwell-Anderson
- Sir Francis Henry MAY
- Mac McCallion
- Thomas McCosker v The State
- C. Steven McGann
- John McKEE
- Danny McLennan
- Duncan McMullin
- Medinilla waterhousei
- Kali Meehan
- Willis Meehan
- Meke
- Melanesian Spearhead Group
- Commins Menapi
- Men's football at the 2003 South Pacific Games
- Tauili'ili Uili Meredith
- Mersey (ship)
- Methodist Church of Fiji and Rotuma
- Methysticin
- Metrosideros ochrantha
- Metroxylon vitiense
- Military of Fiji
- Military-church relations in Fiji
- Daryl Millard
- Ryan Millard
- Albert MILLER
- Minerva Reefs
- Ministry of Education, Heritage and Arts (Fiji)
- Ministry of Foreign Affairs and International Cooperation (Fiji)
- Mirchi FM
- Ghananand Mishra
- Sudesh Mishra
- Miss Fiji
- Sir Charles MITCHELL
- Sir Philip MITCHELL
- Robin E. Mitchell
- Mix FM
- Moala Airport
- Moala Island
- Moala Islands
- Mocis trifasciata
- Mocis vitiensis
- Leonid Moiseyev
- Ratu Tevita MOMOEDONU
- Monarchy of Fiji
- Monasavu Dam
- Charlie MOORE
- Sean Morrell
- Mary Morris
- Howard MORRISON
- Sir John MORRISON
- Monuriki
- Julian Moti
- Moturiki
- Motusa
- Moy (ship)
- Muniswamy MUDLIAR
- Vashist Muni
- Municipal elections in Fiji
  - 2002
  - 2005
- Perumal Mupnar
- Murimuria
- Kini Murimurivalu
- Graham Murray
- Museums in Fiji, list of
- Music of Fiji
- Mussidia pectinicornella
- MV Suilven
- Myristica gillespieana
- Myristica grandifolia
- Myristica macrantha

=== Mac ===
- Sir Kenneth MacKENZIE
- Sir Percy McELWAINE

=== Mara ===
- Adi Asenaca MARA
- Ratu Finau MARA
- Ratu Sir Kamisese MARA
- Ro Adi Lala MARA
- Ratu Tevita Uluilakeba MARA

=== Maharaj ===
- Badri Maharaj
- J. D. Maharaj
- Navin Maharaj
- Sanjeet Chand Maharaj

=== Malani ===
- Roko Malani
- Adi Laufitu MALANI
- Ratu Wilisoni Tuiketai MALANI

== N ==
- Nabagatai
- Nabiti River
- Nabua, Fiji
- Joeli Nabuka
- Nabukelevu
- Eto Nabuli
- Lepani Nabuliwaqa
- Nabuna River
- Isa Nacewa
- Nacula
- Pita Nacuva
- Nadamanu River
- Nadarivatu Dam
- Nadogo F.C.
- Nadogo River
- Nemani Nadolo
- Nadroga F.C.
- Nadroga-Navosa
- Noa Nadruku
- Ratu Sairusi NAGAGAVOKA
- Nagigia Island
- Shivlal Nagindas
- Timoci Nagusa
- Waisake Naholo
- Tomasi Naidole
- Dorsami Naidu
- Richard Naidu
- Naigani
- Apisai Naikatini
- Apisai Naikatini
- Kevin Naiqama
- Wes Naiqama
- Damodaran Nair
- Naiselesele River
- Keleveti NAISORO
- Naitaba
- Nic Naitanui
- Naitasiri District
- Naitasiri
- Jovesa Naivalu
- Sefa Naivalu
- Solomone Naivalu
- Timoci Naivaluwaqa
- Taqele Naiyaravoro
- Jimilai Nakaidawa
- Noa Nakaitaci
- Leone Nakarawa
- Nakasi
- Nakauvadra
- Nakauvadra River
- Nakorotubu District
- Nakorotolutolu River
- Pio Nakubuwai
- Nakura River
- Nala River
- Nalawa F.C.
- Napolioni Nalaga
- Napolioni Nalaga
- Nalagi River
- Livai Nalagilagi
- Simone Nalatu
- Nalawa F.C.
- Nalomate River
- Namalata
- Namatakula
- Jope Namawa
- Namena Lala
- Namada River
- Namata River
- Naming conventions of Fiji
- Namosi District
- Namosi-Naitasiri-Serua language
- Namosi
- Namotu
- Nananu-i-Cake
- Nananu-i-Ra
- Satendra Nandan
- Satya Nandan
- Nanenivuda River
- Ratu Sela NANOVO
- Neumi Nanuku
- Nanuya Lailai
- Nanuya Levu
- Naosara
- Sireli Naqelevuki
- Naqereqere River
- Sekove Naqiolevu
- Nasaqalau
- Nasau Park
- Elina Nasaudrodro
- Nasavu River
- Nasekawa River
- Rupeni Nasiga
- Sisilia Nasiga
- Nasilai River
- Nasinu
- Nasinu F.C.
- Nasinu River
- Nasivi River
- Nasoata River
- Nasoni River
- Nasoqo River
- Nadorelevu, Mount
- Nasuva River
- Natabua High School
- Nate and Hayes
- Natoavou River
- Nationalist Vanua Tako Lavo Party
- Native Land Register
- Native Land Trust Board
- Native Transport Detachment
- Natovi Landing
- Timoci Natuva
- Sioeli Nau
- Naua River
- Sailasa Naucukidi
- Josateki Naulu
- Samueli Naulu
- Viliame Naupoto
- Nausori
- Nausori Highlands
- Nausori International Airport
- Nautanivono
- Navadra
- Ratu Jone NAVAKAMOCEA
- Maciu Navakasuasua
- Navala
- Eparama Navale
- Navilagolago River
- Navilevu River
- Naviti
- Ratu Viliame NAVOKA
- Navua District, Fiji
- Navua F.C.
- Navua River
- Mesake Navugona
- Navuloa River
- Navuturerega River
- Niko Nawaikula
- Nawailevu River
- Ratu Josateki NAWALOWALO
- Valerio Nawatu
- Noa Nayacakalou
- Rusiate Nayacakalou
- Waisea Nayacalevu
- Isoa Neivua
- Maritino Nemani
- Neoveitchia storckii
- Nepalese community in Fiji
- New Labour Unity Party
- New Nationalist Party
- Newnham, S.S.
- Newspapers in Fiji, list of
- NFP–Labour Coalition
- Tom Nicholls
- John Fearns Nicoll
- John NIMMO
- Sangeeta Niranjan
- David Niu
- Ratu Epeli NIUDAMU
- Paula Niukula
- Niumataiwalu
- Noa’tau
- Alipate Noilea
- Nokia Eagles
- Non-Resident Indian
- Northern Air
- Northern Division
- Nourse Line
- Nubu River
- Nuku District, Fiji
- Nukulau

=== Nadi ===
- Nadi
- Nadi District
- Nadi F.C.
- Nadi International Airport
- Nadi River

=== Naevo ===
- Apenisa Naevo
- Ratu Apisai NAEVO
- Semesi NAEVO

=== Nailatikau ===
- Adi Koila Mara NAILATIKAU
- Ratu Epeli NAILATIKAU
- Ratu Epeli NAILATIKAU I
- Ratu Epeli NAILATIKAU I
- Ratu Epeli Qaraninamu NAILATIKAU

=== Nand ===
- Gyani Nand
- Nainendra Nand
- Ragho Nand
- Suruj Mati Nand

=== Narain, Narayan ===
- Deo Narain
- NARAIN, Sathi
- Irene Jai Narayan
- Paresh Narayan
- Udit NARAYAN

=== National ===
- National Anthem (God Bless Fiji)
- National Congress of Fiji
- National constituencies
- National Council for Building a Better Fiji
- National Farmers Union of Fiji
- National Democratic Party (1960s)
- National Democratic Party (2006)
- National Federation Party
- National Federation Party - Dove faction
- National Federation Party - Flower faction
- National Football League
- National language debate
- National Security Council (Fiji)
- National Stadium (Suva)
- National Super League 2014
- National Trust of Fiji

=== Neuburgia ===
- Neuburgia alata
- Neuburgia collina
- Neuburgia macrocarpa
- Neuburgia macroloba

== O ==
- Sir George O'BRIEN
- Terry O'DONNELL
- Ochetellus sororis
- Office of International Treasury Control
- Ogea Driki
- Ogea Levu
- Aisake Ó hAilpín
- Seán Óg Ó hAilpín
- Setanta Ó hAilpín
- Teu Ó hAilpín
- Oinafa
- Olorua
- One Fiji Party
- Ono Island
- Ono-i-Lau
- Open constituencies
- Operation Morris Dance
- Operation Quickstep
- Orange dove
- Order of Fiji
- Orthetrum serapia
- Patrick OSBORNE
- Patterson OTI
- Evelyn Otto
- Outline of Fiji
- Ovalau

== P ==
- Pacific Broadcasting Services Fiji
- Pacific Conference of Churches
- Pacific Oceania Davis Cup team
- Pacific Rim Rugby Championship
- Pacnews
- Lavenia Padarath
- Narendra Kumar Padarath
- Steve PAENIU
- Palolo worm
- Pandanus joskei
- Pandanus taveuniensis
- Paramount Chief of Fiji
- Craig Parker
- Parkia parrii
- Parliament (Fiji)
- Party of National Unity (PANU)
- Parliamentary Organization for Indigenous Fijians
- Davendra Pathik
- Paulini
- Paulini discography
- George Hamilton Pearce
- Penang River
- Penang (Rakiraki) Sugar Mill
- People's Charter for Change, Peace and Progress
- People's Coalition
- People's Democratic Party
- People's National Party
- Pepjei
- Denis Perera
- Pericles (ship)
- Rebecca Perrott
- Philidris nagasau
- Tyrone Phillips
- Tony Philp
- Physokentia thurstonii
- James PICKERING
- Manikam V. PILLAI
- Samresan Pillay
- Sarojini Pillay
- Wayne Pivac
- Pinctada maxima
- Pipermethystine
- Pipturus platyphyllus
- Pittosporum pickeringii
- Pittosporum rhytidocarpum
- Wayne Pivac
- Platymantis megabotoniviti
- Platymantis vitianus
- Platymantis vitiensis
- Podocarpus neriifolius
- Political families in Fiji, list of
- Political parties in Fiji, list of
- Politics of Fiji
- Polyalthia laddiana
- Poonah (Ship)
- Porphyrosela aglaozona
- Paulo Posiano
- Post Fiji
- Post Fiji Stadium
- Postage stamps and postal history of Fiji
- Ranjesh Prakash
- Premna protrusa
- Presidents of Fiji (List)
- President of the Court of Appeal
- President of the Senate of Fiji
- Presidential elections in Fiji
  - 2000
  - 2006
- President's Overseas XV
- Katharine PRICHARD
- Prime Ministers of Fiji (List)
- Prince Charles Park
- Pritchardia thurstonii
- Carl Probert
- Proposed states of Australia, list of
- Protector of Fiji (Bei Kai Viti)
- Proceratium vinaka
- Provinces of Fiji
- Psilogramma jordana
- Caroline Puamau
- Puisne judge
- Pullea perryana
- Hari Punja
- Punjas Rugby Series

=== Pacific ===
- Pacific Alliance Leaders Meeting
- Pacific Island Air
- Pacific Islands Forum
- Pacific Islands Rugby Alliance
- Pacific Islanders rugby union team
- Pacific Rugby Cup
- Pacific Rugby League International
- Pacific Union

=== Patel ===
- A.D. PATEL
- Harilal Manilal Patel
- Navin Patel
- R. D. Patel
- S. B. Patel
- Vimla L. Patel
- Vinod Patel
- Vinubhai Patel

=== Prasad ===
- Ayodhya Prasad
- Bijay PRASAD
- Biman Prasad
- Calvin Prasad
- Giyannedra Prasad
- Krishna PRASAD

=== Pterophylla ===
- Pterophylla affinis
- Pterophylla exigua
- Pterophylla richii
- Pterophylla vitiensis

== Q ==
- Qaloyaqa River
- Qamea
- Qaraniqio River
- Qaranivalu
- Laisenia Qarase
- Qawa River
- Qelelevu
- Akapusi Qera
- Nacanieli Qerewaqa
- Alipate Qetaki
- Apimeleki Qiliho
- Adi Litia QIONIBARAVI
- Henry Qiodravu
- Qoliqoli Bill
- Gabriele QORO
- Adi Sivia QORO
- Emasi Qovu
- Jone QOVO
- Queen Elizabeth Barracks
- Queen of Fiji
- Queen Victoria School (Fiji)
- Peter Quilliam
- Renold Quinlan
- Qurai

== R ==
- Ra
- Seru Rabeni
- Rabi Council of Leaders
- Rabi Island
- Sitiveni Rabuka
- Lagani Rabukawaqa
- Orisi Rabukawaqa
- Kiniviliame Radaveta
- Patrick Raddock
- Saula Radidi
- Radini Nayau
- Semi Radradra
- Pramod Rae
- Kathlyn Ragg
- Monica Raghwan
- Mataiasi Ragiagia
- Lote Raikabula
- David Raikuna
- Rail transport in Fiji
- Jone Railomo
- Simon Raiwalui
- George Shiu Raj
- Setariki Rakabula
- Rakiraki
- Rakiraki F.C.
- Balwant Singh Rakkha
- Jonetani Ralulu
- Jack Ram
- Kallu Dhani Ram
- Rishi Ram
- Shree Ramlu
- K. C. Ramrakha
- Eminoni Ranacovu
- John RANKINE
- James Ramchandar Rao
- Nikola Raoma
- Rapid (brig)
- Raranitiqa
- Vesi Rarawa
- Abdul Rahim Rasheed
- Manoa Rasigatale
- Isaia Rasila
- Rasolo
- Ratu Talemo RATAKELE
- Alipate Ratini
- Ratu
- Jonetani Ratu
- Michael Ratu
- Ropate Ratu
- Ratu Cakobau Park
- Ratu Kadavulevu School
- Ratumaibulu
- Ratu Sir Lala Sukuna Day
- Ratu Sir Lala Sukuna Day, 2005
- Aca Ratuva
- Kameli Ratuvou
- Daniel Rauicava
- Jacob Rauluni
- Mosese Rauluni
- Peni Ravai
- Semi Ravouvou
- Malakai Ravulo
- Asesela Ravuvu
- Ifereimi Rawaqa
- Taniela Rawaqa
- Ratu Josaia RAYAWA
- Reconciliation and Unity Commission
  - Blue Ribbon campaign
  - Yellow Ribbon campaign
  - Moderate voices
  - Military opposition
  - Military-church relations in Fiji
  - Foreign reaction
  - Religious reaction
- Red-throated lorikeet
- Reddy Group
- Jai Ram Reddy
- Kamlesh Reddy
- K. S. Reddy
- Mahendra Reddy
- Nitya Nand Reddy
- Frankie Reed
- Repatriation of indentured Indians from Fiji
- Reserve Bank of Fiji
- Return to the Blue Lagoon
- Rhine (ship)
- Rhone (ship)
- Sir Arthur RICHARDS
- Tom RICKETTS
- Peter Ridgeway
- Marieta Rigamoto
- Ringgold Isles
- Rivers in Fiji, list of
- Ro
- Fred Robarts
- Sir Hercules ROBINSON
- Robinson Crusoe Island
- David Rodan
- Sir Cecil Hunter-RODWELL
- Rusiate Rogoyawa
- Saimoni Rokini
- Roko
- Nasoni Roko
- Alex Rokobaro
- Ratu Maculeku ROKOCEGU
- Joe Rokocoko
- Semesa Rokoduguni
- Seveci Rokotakala
- Roko Tui
- Roko Tui Bau
- Roko Tui Dreketi
- Roko Tui Namata
- Ratu Kolinio ROKOTUINACEVA
- Roman Catholicism in Fiji
- Junior Roqica
- Junior Rasolea
- Rosiloa
- Yuval Rotem
- Roger Rousseau
- Michelle Rowland
- Swami Rudrananda
- Rugby league in Fiji
- Rugby union in Fiji
- Rugby Union (Fiji national rugby union team)
- Rugby Sevens (Fiji national rugby union sevens team)
- Rugby union in Rotuma
- Epeli Ruivadra (rugby union, born 1977)
- Rukuruku River
- William RYDER

=== Radio ===
- Radio Australia
- Radio Fiji One
- Radio Fiji Two
- Radio Navtarang

=== Rewa ===
- Rewa
- Rewa Bridge
- Rewa F.C.
- Rewa Planters Union
- Rewa River

=== Rotuma, Rotuman ===
- Rotuma
- Rotuma Airport
- Rotuma Day
- Rotuma Day, 2005
- Rotuma Group
- Rotuman Islands Council
- Rotuman language
- Rotuma myzomela

== S ==
- Sabeto River
- Ronals SACKVILLE
- Sacred Heart Church
- Asesela Sadole
- Osea Sadrau
- Ian Saigatu
- Losena Salabula
- Kaiyava Salusalu
- Jagannath Sami
- Madeleine Sami
- Samabula River
- Jimione Samisoni
- Adi Mere Tuisalalo SAMISONI
- Radike Samo
- Ravuama Samo
- Yevgeny Samoteykin
- Samulayo
- Totaram Sanadhya
- Ron Sang
- Sangola (ship)
- Santhia (ship)
- Matareti Sarasau
- Saraswati College
- Saravi River
- Sarowaqa River
- Apolosi Satala
- Viliame Satala
- Anand Satyanand
- Sau (Rotuman king)
- Meli Saubulinayau
- Tomasi Sauqaqa
- Vereniki Sauturaga
- Charles SAVAGE
- Isikia Savua
- Savu River (Fiji)
- Savuto Vakadewavosa
- Savusavu
- Savusavu Airport
- Savusavu F.C.
- Sawana
- Aiyaz Sayed-Khaiyum
- Scaevola floribunda
- Deryck Scarr
- Les Scheinflug
- John Maurice Scott
- Michael Dishington Scott
- Scouting and Guiding in Fiji
- Jocelynne Scutt
- Seaqaqa F.C.
- Seaqaqa River
- Dixon Seeto
- Senate (Fiji)
- Jona Senilagakali
- Navitalai Senilagakali
- Henry Seniloli
- Ratu Jope SENILOLI
- Popi Seniloli
- Sennit
- Waisale Serevi
- Serianthes vitiensis
- Apaitia Seru
- Fili Seru
- John Seru
- Nacanieli Seru
- Serua District
- Serua, Mount
- Serua Province
- Serua District
- Serukeirewa
- Ratu Semi SERUVAKULA
- Viliame Seruvakula
- Koli Sewabu
- C. A. Shah
- Nazhat Shameem
- Shaista Shameem
- Shangri-La's Fijian Resort
- Rishi Shankar
- Ram Sharan
- Owen Sheers
- Shipwrecked
- Robert Shuster
- M. Osman Siddique
- Sigatoka
- Sigatoka Sand Dunes
- Sigatoka River
- Sikhism in Fiji
- Semesa Sikivou
- Peniasi Silatolu
- Timoci Silatolu
- Silktail
- Morgan Simmons
- Nigel Simpson
- Ashton Sims
- Barry Sims
- Korbin Sims
- Ruan Sims
- Tariq Sims
- Sakiusa Sing
- Silktail
- Sitiveni Sivivatu
- Sivoki
- Savenaca Siwatibau
- Suliana Siwatibau
- Sky Fiji
- Sky Pacific
- Slaty monarch
- Apisai Smith
- Greg Smith (rugby coach)
- Greg SMITH
- Stephen SMITH
- Wilma SMITH
- Philip Snow
- Jimmy Snuka
- Tamina Snuka
- Social Liberal Multicultural Party
- Solicitor-General (Fiji)
- Solkope
- Dave SOLOMON
- Setefano Somoca
- Somosomo
- Somosomo Creek
- Somosomo Strait
- Enele Sopoaga
- Soqosoqo Duavata ni Lewenivanua
- Soqosoqo ni Vakavulewa ni Taukei
- Gagaj Maraf Solomone
- Warren Sorby
- Soroaqali
- Seule Soromon
- Usaia Sotutu
- South Indians in Fiji
- Southern Cross Cable
- Southern Division Kisan Sangh
- Ratu Jovesa SOVASOVA
- Waisale Sovatabua
- Sovi Basin
- Sovi River
- Speaker of the House of Representatives of Fiji
- Adi Kuini SPEED
- George Speight
- Graham Speight
- Henry Speight
- James Spigelman
- Spiraeanthemum graeffei
- Spiraeanthemum katakata
- Spiraeanthemum serratum
- Spodoptera mauritia
- Sport in Fiji
- Sri Siva Subramaniya temple
- S. Sriskandarajah
- Sir Charles ST JULIAN
- Paul STEIN
- St John's College, Fiji
- Rick Stone
- James Storer
- Storckiella vitiensis
- Goran Šubara
- Subrail Park
- Nikolai Sudarikov
- Suetabu River
- Sugar Cane farmers unions in Fiji
- Sugar Cane Growers Council
- Sugar City Ratepayers Alliance
- Sugar mills in Fiji
- Netani Suka
- Netani Sukanaivalu
- Sefanaia Sukanaivalu
- Waisale Sukanaveita
- Ratu Sir Lala SUKUNA
- Sukuna Bowl
- Sulphur-breasted myzomela
- Sulu
- Sun Air (Fiji)
- Super Model
- Supreme Court (Fiji)
- Bataram SURI
- Survivor: Fiji
- Joanna Sutton
- John SUTTON
- Suva
- Suva Adventist College
- Suva City Council
- Suva Fiji Temple
- Suva F.C.
- Suva Grammar School
- Suva Highlanders
- Avinesh Suwamy
- Muthu Swamy
- Ofa Swann
- Sir Ernest Bickham SWEET-ESCOTT
- Syria (ship)

=== Schefflera ===
- Schefflera costata
- Schefflera euthytricha
- Schefflera seemanniana
- Schefflera vitiensis

=== Syzygium ===
- Syzygium amplifolium
- Syzygium diffusum
- Syzygium fijiense
- Syzygium minus
- Syzygium phaeophyllum
- Syzygium purpureum
- Syzygium seemannianum
- Syzygium wolfii

=== Sharma ===
- Devanesh Sharma
- Gabriel Sharma
- Harish Sharma
- Krishna Chand Sharma
- Neil Sharma
- Sachida Nand Sharma
- Shiu Sharan Sharma
- Shri Krishna Sharma
- Tulsi Ram Sharma
- Vivekanand Sharma
- Vyas Deo Sharma

=== Singh ===
- Agni Deo Singh
- Ajay SINGH
- Ajit Swaran Singh
- Alpana Singh
- Alvin Singh
- Anand Kumar SINGH
- Anirudh SINGH
- Attar Singh
- Bhagwan Singh
- Bobby Singh
- Chandra Singh
- C. P. Singh
- Chattur Singh
- Davendra Singh
- Gurjit SINGH
- Gyan SINGH
- James Shankar Singh
- Jason Singh
- K. B. Singh
- Mehar Singh
- Nibhray SINGH
- Parmanand Singh
- Pravin Singh
- Prem SINGH
- Ram SINGH
- Ram Jati Singh
- Raman Pratap Singh
- Rebecca Singh
- Satendra SINGH
- Uday SINGH
- Ujagar Singh
- Vijay Singh
- Vijay R. Singh

=== SS ===
- SS Chenab
- SS Fazilka
- SS Fultala
- SS Ganges (1906)
- SS Indus (1904)
- SS Mutlah
- SS Newnham
- SS Sangola
- SS Santhia
- SS Sutlej
- SS Vadala
- SS Virawa
- SS Wardha

=== South Pacific ===
- South Pacific air ferry route in World War II
- South Pacific Applied Geoscience Commission
- South Pacific Championship
- South Pacific Forum
- South Pacific Scouts
- South Pacific Stock Exchange
- South Pacific Tourism Organisation

== T ==
- Adi Finau TABAKAUCORO
- Banuve Tabakaucoro
- Tabernaemontana thurstonii
- Tabia River
- Table No. 21
- Tabua
- Ilivasi Tabua
- Semi Tadulala
- Saveneca Taga
- Michael Tagicakibau
- Sailosi Tagicakibau
- Susan Tagicakibau
- Tagimoucia
- Peni Tagive
- Tagroa Siria
- Tailevu
- Tailevu Knights
- Tailevu/Naitasiri F.C.
- Tailevu North F.C.
- Taininbeka
- Sapeta Taito
- Seveci Taka
- Amani Takayawa
- Takia (watercraft)
- Ratu Inoke TAKIVEIKATA (Qaranivalu)
- Ratu Inoke TAKIVEIKATA (Vice-President)
- Metuisela Talebula
- Netani Talei
- Joe Tamani
- Saimoni Tamani
- Simione Tamanisau
- Jeremaiya Tamanisau
- Seta Tamanivalu
- Howie Tamati
- Tamavua River
- Antonio Tanaburenisau
- Kaliova Nauqe Tani
- Iliesa Tanivula
- Aisea Taoka
- Tarau of Tovu Totoya
- Aisake Tarogi
- 'Ana Taufe'ulungaki
- Ratu Kiniviliame TAUKEINIKORO
- Taunovo River
- Tauraria
- Tautoga
- Ratu Sir Josaia TAVAIQIA
- Tavarua
- Taveuni
- Taveuni F.C.
- Taveuni, Mount
- Taveuni beetle
- Taveuni F.C.
- Tavewa
- Tavo
- Rebecca Tavo
- Kaliopate Tavola
- Tavoro Creek
- Jone Tawake
- Setareki Tawake
- John Tay
- Teresia Teaiwa
- Tēfui
- Remueru Tekiate
- Tekken
- Tekken Revolution
- Tekken Tag Tournament 2
- Saula Telawa
- Telecommunications in Fiji
- Esala Teleni
- Telephone numbers in Fiji
- Ransley Thacker
- The Adorable Outcast
- The Blue Lagoon
- The Land Has Eyes
- The People of Paradise
- Laurence Thoms
- Thomson Park
- James Beveridge Thomson
- Manoa Thompson
- Peter THOMSON
- Sir John THURSTON
- Thurston Gardens
- Tibitibi River
- Moti Tikaram
- Ramon Tikaram
- Tanita Tikaram
- Pio Tikoduadua
- Samisoni Tikoinasau
- Asaeli Tikoirotuma
- Pio Bosco Tikoisuva
- Romanu Tikotikoca
- Virginia Tilley
- Alan TIPPERT
- Tivua Island
- Malakai Tiwa
- Apisai Toga
- Iliesa TOGA
- Inisai Toga
- Toga River
- Adi Davila TOGANIVALU
- Togolevu River
- Toguru River
- Farasiko Tokarei
- Tokoriki
- Savenaca Tokula
- Veresa Toma
- Tomanivi, Mount
- Tongan Kava Ceremony-Taumafa Kava
- John TOOHEY
- Top Spin 3
- Apisai Tora
- Semisi Tora
- Tora ni Bau
- Totoya
- Tovata Confederacy
- Transport in Fiji
- TREY, MC
- Tribewanted
- Tropical Depression 04F (2009)
- Tropical Depression 10F (2004)
- Peter Tsiamalili
- Kalaveti Tuiyabayaba
- Aisea Tuidraki
- Patiliai Tuidraki
- Talemaitoga Tuapati
- Tubou
- Manasa Tugia
- Aisea Tuidraki
- Aisea Tuilevu
- Malakai TUILOA
- Kitione Tuinaosara
- Ilisoni Tuinawaivuvu
- Joe Tuineau
- Ilaitia Tuisese
- Ratu Sakiusa TUISOLIA
- Josua Tuisova
- Sir Timoci TUIVAGA
- Naitini Tuiyau
- J. B. Tularam
- Manu Tupou
- Manueli Tulo
- Taliai Tupou
- Lote TUQIRI
- Lote TUQIRI (rugby union)
- Turaga
- Turaga na Gonesau
- Turaga na Ratu ni Natauiya
- Tuva River
- Tuvuca
- Isireli Tuvuki
- Jerry Tuwai
- Pio Tuwai

=== Tavua ===
- Tavua
- Tavua District
- Tavua F.C.
- Tavua Island
- Tavua River

=== Tui ===
- Tui Cakau
- Tui Cakau's army
- Tui Delai Gau
- Tui Fiti
- Tui Lau
- Tui Nadi
- Tui Namosi
- Tui Nayau
- Tui Viti
- Tui Vuda

== U ==
- Akuila Uate
- John UDAL
- Udre UDRE
- Uea
- Alifereti Finau Ulugalala
- Uluigalau, Mount
- Uluilakeba I
- ULUILAKEBA III, Tevita
- Alfred Uluinayau
- Nat Uluiviti
- Kula Kei Uluivuya
- Ulupoka
- Uma of Nukunuku
- Chandu Umaria
- United Fiji Party (Soqosoqo Duavata ni Lewenivanua)
- United Nations, Fiji Mission to
- United Nations Security Council Resolution 287
- United States Ambassador to Fiji
- Universities in Fiji, list of
- University of Fiji
- University of the South Pacific
- Solofa Uota
- Jone Usamate
- USS Warbler (MSC-206)

== V ==
- Vadala (ship)
- Vaileka
- Apolonia Vaivai
- Saïmoni Vaka
- Marika Vakacegu
- Savuto Vakadewavosa
- Ratu Rakuita VAKALALABURE
- Ratu Tevita VAKALALABURE
- Niko Vakararawa
- Osea Vakatalesau
- Etuate Vakatawa
- Virimi Vakatawa
- Tomasi Vakatora
- Ratu Kinijioji VAKAWALETABUA
- Samu Valelala
- Amasio Valence
- Manasa Vaniqi
- Vanua
- Vanua Balavu
- Vanuabalavu Airport
- Vanua Levu
- Vanua Levu Group
- Vanua Levu mine
- Vanua Tako Lavo Party
- Rupeni Varea
- Vatanitawake
- Vatoa
- Jioji Vatubua
- Waisale WATUBUA
- Vatukoula
- Vatukoula F.C.
- Vatukoula mine
- Vatulele
- Vaturova River
- Vatu Vara
- Waisale Vatuvoka
- Vatuwaqa River
- John Henry Vaughan
- Lekh Ram Vayeshnoi
- Veeru Waah Bhaai Waah
- George Veikoso
- Viliame Veikoso
- Veinuqa River
- Joeli Veitayaki
- Veitokani ni Lewenivanua Vakarisito (Christian Democratic Alliance)
- Veisari River
- Niko Verekauta
- Hikmat Singh Verma
- Versicolored monarch
- Vicariate Apostolic of Fiji
- Vice-President of Fiji
- Joeli Vidiri
- Savu Viliame
- Violence against women in Fiji
- Pedro Virgil
- Viria Sugar Mill
- Samisoni Viriviri
- Virawa (ship)
- Visa policy of Fiji
- Visa requirements for Fijian citizens
- Ratu Tanoa VISAWAQA
- Viseisei
- Vishal Sangh
- Lolagi Visinia
- Visoto
- Viti FM
- Viti Levu
- Viti Levu giant pigeon
- Viti Levu Group
- Viti Levu rail
- Vitogo River
- Vitu
- Jesoni Vitusagavulu
- Viwa Island
- Vodafone Arena (Fiji)
- Vodafone M.I.C
- Vodafone Ratu Cakobau Park
- Apenisa Tuta Vodo
- Vola ni Kawa Bula
- Volcanoes in Fiji, list of
- Voma, Mount
- Anatole von Hügel
- Ilisoni Vonomateiratu
- Vorovoro
- Josefa Vosanibola
- Manoa Vosawai
- Voting system of Fiji
- Watisoni Votu
- Vuaqava
- Emosi Vucago
- Vuda Point
- Vuda River
- Vuetasau
- Josefa Vueti
- Tomasi Vuetilovoni
- Tevita Vuibau
- Adi Lagamu VUIYASAWA
- Vukinavanua
- Mika Vukona
- Josateki Vula
- Samuela Vula
- Laisa Vulakoro
- Albert Vulivuli
- Finau Vulivuli
- Eloni Vunakece
- Marika Vunibaka
- Vunibelebele River
- Berenado Vunibobo
- Vunidawa River
- Vunikavikaloa
- Samuela Vunisa
- Vunisea Airport
- Vunivalu of Bau
- Vunivia River
- Atunasia Vunivialu
- Mereseini Vuniwaqa
- Vuniyaro River
- Peceli Vuniyayawa
- Isikeli Vuruna

=== Veitchia ===
- Veitchia filifera
- Veitchia simulans
- Veitchia vitiensis

=== Volavola ===
- Ben Volavola
- Mosese Volavola
- Ratu Peni VOLAVOLA
- Timoci Volavola

== W ==
- Wailagi Lala
- Wailoa Hydro Power Station
- Wailevu River
- Waibula River (Taveuni)
- Waibula River (Viti Levu)
- Waidalici River
- Waidamu River
- Waidina River
- Wailevu River (Vanua Levu)
- Wailoa River
- Waimanu River
- Waimaro River
- Wainadoi River
- Wainibuka River
- Ulaiasi Wainidroa
- Wainikoro River
- Wainikoroiluva River
- Wainimala River
- Wainivesi River
- Wainunu River
- Wairikicake River
- Wairikiqisi River
- Waisoi mine
- Waisomo River
- Stanley Waita
- Wakaya
- Sisa Waqa
- Taniela Waqa
- Josaia Waqabaca
- Dominiko Waqaniburotu
- Jeremaia Waqanisau
- Viliame Waqaseduadua
- Taito Waqavakatoga
- Samu Wara
- Taito Waradi
- Gordon WARD
- Wardha (ship)
- Warning
- Joseph WATERHOUSE
- Dick Watling
- Peceli Wawavanua
- Wickrema Weerasooria
- Mark WEINBERG
- Alfred Wendt
- Jone Wesele
- Mekeli Wesley
- Tai Wesley
- West Fijian languages
- West Fijian – Rotuman languages
- Western Crusaders
- Western Division
- Western Fijian language
- Western United Front
- David Whippey
- Marques Whippy
- Mikaelar Whippy
- Whistling fruit dove
- Brayden Wiliame
- J. WILLIAMS
- Ron WILLIAMS
- Women in Fiji
- Pio Wong
- James Roland Wood
- World Rugby Pacific Challenge
- World War I aces from Fiji, list of
- Ulamila Kurai Wragg
- Henry Wrenfordsley

== Y ==
- Akuila Yabaki
- Konisi Yabaki
- Yacata
- Yadua Levu
- Yadua Tabu
- Daniel Yakopo
- Yalalevu
- Alefoso Yalayalatabua
- Yanawai River
- Yangonin
- Yanuca
- Yanuca Lailai
- Yanuca Levu
- Jerry Yanuyanutawa
- Yaqara River
- Yaqona
- Yasawa
- Yasawa Island Airport
- Yasawa Islands
- Peceli Yato
- Yat Sen School
- Ratu Jekesoni Lewenilovo YAVALANAVANUA
- Years in Fiji, list of
- Alfred Karney Young
- Ted YOUNG

== Z ==
- Jörg Zimmermann
- Kenneth Vincent ZINCK

== See also ==
Major topics

- Fiji (main article)
- Communications in Fiji
- 1997 Constitution of Fiji
  - Preamble
  - Chapters 1
  - 2
  - 3
  - 4
  - 5
  - 6
  - 7
  - 8
  - 9
  - 10
  - 11
  - 12
  - 13
  - 14
  - 15
  - 16
  - 17
- Culture of Fiji
- Demographics of Fiji
- Economy of Fiji
- Famous Fijians
- Foreign relations of Fiji
- History of Fiji
- Local government of Fiji
- Military of Fiji
- Music of Fiji
- Outline of Fiji
- Politics of Fiji
- Transport in Fiji

Other Fiji-related lists

- Airlines of Fiji, list of
- Airlines of Oceania, list of
- Airports by ICAO code: N, list of
- Airports in Fiji, list of
- Birds of Fiji, list of
- Chief Justices of Fiji, list of
- Cities and towns in Fiji, list of
- Diplomatic missions in Fiji, list of
- Diplomatic missions of Fiji, list of
- Elections in Fiji, list of
- Festivals in Fiji, list of
- House of Representatives of Fiji
- Chairman of the Great Council of Chiefs
- Birds of Fiji, list of
- Cities and towns in Fiji
- Elections in Fiji, list of
- Diplomatic missions in Fiji
- Diplomatic missions of Fiji
- Fiji national rugby union players, list of
- Fijians, list of
- Fijian Affairs Ministers
- Fijian politicians, list of
- Fijian records in swimming, list of
- Fijian sportspeople, list of
- Fijian submissions for the Academy Award for Best Foreign Language Film, list of
- Fijian Victoria Cross recipients, list of
- Football clubs in Fiji, list of
- Foreign Ministers of Fiji
- Fossiliferous stratigraphic units in Fiji, list of
- Governor of Fiji
- Governor-General of Fiji
- Head of State of Fiji
- High commissioners of New Zealand to Fiji, list of
- High commissioners of the United Kingdom to Fiji, list of
- Indian indenture ships to Fiji
- Islands of Fiji, list of
- Leader of the Opposition
- Lepidoptera of Fiji, list of
- Mammals of Fiji, list of
- Museums in Fiji, list of
- Newspapers in Fiji, list of
- Political families in Fiji, list of
- Political parties in Fiji, list of
- Premiers of the Kingdom of Viti, list of
- Presidents of Fiji, list of
- Prime Ministers of Fiji, list of
- Proposed states of Australia, list of
- Provinces of Fiji, list of
- Rivers in Fiji, list of
- Senators of Fiji, list of
- Speakers of the House of Representatives of Fiji, list of
- Universities in Fiji, list of
- Vice-Presidents of Fiji, list of
- Volcanoes in Fiji, list of
- World War I aces from Fiji, list of
- Years in Fiji, list of
