= Julie Paucker =

Swiss dramaturge

Julie Paucker (born 1976) is a Swiss dramaturge, arts administrator, and author. She serves as the artistic director of KULA Compagnie, an international theatre group. She is also the artistic director of Schweizer Theatertreffen, an annual multilingual festival that showcases Swiss theatre.

== Biography ==
Paucker was born in Basel, 1976. She grew up in Zürich. She studied German and Comparative and French Literature in Zürich and in Hamburg. After completing her studies, she worked as a project manager for theatre at Migros Culture Percentage.

From 2006 to 2012 she worked as a dramaturge at the Theatre Basel, working alongside Elias Perrig, Werner Düggelin, Christiane Pohle, Corinna von Rad, and Christoph Marthaler. She partnered with Die Zeit to design a speech series called Wohin treibt die Schweiz?, which she later published as a book with Peer Teuwsen. From 2013 to 2018 she worked as the dramaturge and a co-director at the Deutsches Nationaltheater and Staatskapelle Weimar in Germany. She worked with Robert Shuster to co-found KULA Compagnie, a multilingual international theatre platform made up of German, French, Afghan, and Israeli actors. Her company performs in Switzerland, Germany, France, and Poland. She serves as the artistic director for KULA Comapgnie and has worked with the Afghan theatre group AZDAR.

Paucker worked as a guest lecturer at the Universities of Georgetown (Austin) and Kennesaw (Georgia), at ESAD – actor's academy in Paris and regularly at the Academy of Performing Arts Ludwigsburg (ADK). In 2020 she spent two months in the USA, together with director Brian Bell, working with theatre students on Horvàth's Love, Hope & Charity at the University of North Texas, and gave several workshops at universities and at the Goethe Institute/Swiss Consulate Atlanta. Since autumn 2020 she has been artistic director of the annual multilingual festival Schweizer Theatertreffen. The festival is also a platform to connect the various theatre scenes across Switzerland that speak different languages.
