= Sarojini =

Sarojini is a feminine given name. Notable people with the name include:

- Sarojini Charles, Sri Lankan Tamil civil servant
- Sarojini Naidu (1879–1949), President of the Indian National Conference
- Sarojini Pillay (21st century), Fijian academic
- Sarojini Sahoo (born 1956), Indian feminist writer
- Sarojini Yogeswaran (died 1998), Sri Lankan politician
