= Aisea =

Aisea is a masculine given name that may refer to

- Aisea Havili (born 1977), Tongan rugby union player
- Aisea Katonivere (died 2013), Fijian chief and politician
- Aisea Natoga (born 1990), Fijian rugby union player
- Aisea Tohi (born 1987), Tongan sprint runner
- Aisea Tuidraki (1916–1966), Fijian cricketer
- Aisea Tuilevu (born 1972), Fijian rugby union player
