= Tevita Vuibau =

Fijian politician (born 1956)

Tevita Komaidruka Vuibau was born on the 24 January 1956. He is a marine geology specialist and former principal scientific officer in the Mineral Resource Department. In January 2007 he was appointed to the interim cabinet as Minister for Lands and Mineral Resources.
