= Lagani Rabukawaqa =

Lagani Rabukawaqa is a pop musician from Fiji who achieved fame in Oceania in the 1980s.
