= List of storms named Mick =

The name Mick has been used for two tropical cyclone in the South Pacific after replacing Mark after 1982-83:

- Cyclone Mick (1993) – Weak tropical cyclone that passed through Fiji, Tonga and New Zealand.
- Cyclone Mick (2009) – Made landfall on Fiji and killed at least eight.
