= List of museums in Fiji =

This is a list of museums in Fiji.

== Museums in Fiji ==
- 21K Gallery
- Bilo Battery
- Fiji Museum
- Gallery Gondwana Fiji
- Gallery of Fijian Art & Design
- Global Girmit Museum
- La Galerie
- Levuka Museum and Community Centre

== See also ==
- List of museums
