= Radio Navtarang =

- Sydney; Australia
- Branding: Radio Navtarang

Programming
- Format: Bollywood

Ownership
- Owner: Navtarang Media Group

History
- First air date: 1993

Links
- Webcast: http://www.navtarang.com.au/radio.php
- Website: navtarang.com.au

Radio Navtarang is a Hindi radio station in Sydney, Australia. It is owned by Navtarang Media Group.

The station is also available online via live streaming.
