= 1996 Fiji rugby union tour of New Zealand and South Africa =

Summary
| P | W | D | L |
Total
| 5 | 4 | 0 | 1 |
Test match
| 1 | 0 | 0 | 1 |
Opponent
| P | W | D | L |
South Africa
| 1 | 0 | 0 | 1 |

The 1996 Fiji rugby union tour of New Zealand and South Africa were a series of matches played in June and July in New Zealand and South Africa by the Fiji national rugby union team.

== Results ==
Scores and results list Fiji's points tally first.

| Opposing team | For | Against | Date | Venue | Status |
|---|---|---|---|---|---|
| North Auckland | 49 | 18 | 17 June 1996 | | Tour match |
| Poverty Bay Rugby Football Union | 49 | 6 | 19 June 1996 | | Tour match |
| Waikato | 33 | 25 | 23 June 1996 | | Tour match |
| South Africa | 18 | 43 | 2 July 1996 | Pretoria | Test match |
| Northern Transvaal | 44 | 37 | 5 July 1996 | | Tour match |
