= Maqewa =

Island in the Ringgold Isles, Fiji

Native name: Manggewa
- Location within Fiji

Geography
- Location: South Pacific Ocean
- Coordinates: 16.50°S 179.68°W
- Archipelago: Ringgold Isles
- Area: 0.26 km^{2} (0.10 sq mi)

Administration
- Fiji
- Division: Eastern Division
- Province: Cakaudrove
- Tikina: Wainikeli

Demographics
- Population: 0

Additional information
- Time zone: UTC GMT +12

Maqewa Island (also written Manggewa) is an uninhabited volcanic island in Fiji, a member of the Ringgold Isles, which forms an outlier group to the northern island of Vanua Levu. It is narrow and rocky. It has a total land area of 26.05 hectares (64.4 acres).

== See also ==
- Desert island
- List of islands
