= Syzygium wolfii =

Conservation status
- Least Concern (IUCN 3.1)

Scientific classification
- Kingdom: Plantae
- Clade: Tracheophytes
- Clade: Angiosperms
- Clade: Eudicots
- Clade: Rosids
- Order: Myrtales
- Family: Myrtaceae
- Genus: Syzygium
- Species: S. wolfii

Binomial name
- Syzygium wolfii (Gillespie) Merr. & L.M.Perry

Synonyms
- Eugenia wolfii Gillespie

Species of flowering plant

Syzygium wolfii is a species of flowering plant in the family Myrtaceae. It is a tree endemic to Fiji.
