= Koro-ni-O =

Village in Fiji

- Village
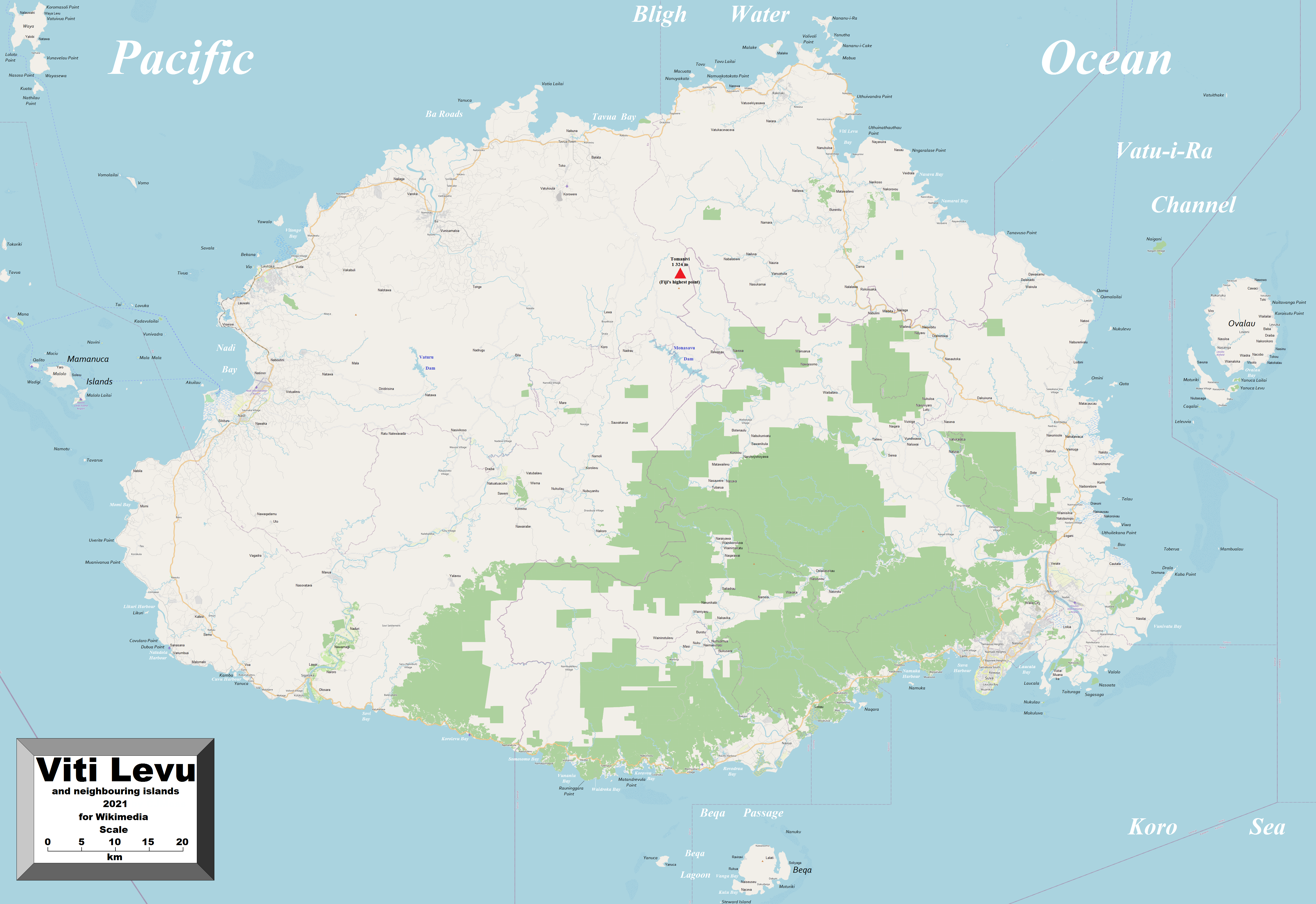
- Viti Levu with Koro in island's centre

- Location in Fiji
- Country: Fiji
- Island: Viti Levu
- Division: Western Division
- Province: Ba
- Time zone: UTC+12

Koro-ni-O (Fijian pronunciation: [koro.ni.o]) is a village in Fiji, noted as the centre of the country's hydroelectric industry. The Monasavu Dam hydroelectric scheme, built between 1978 and 1983, features an 82-meter high earthen dam on the Nanuka River. A 5.4-kilometer long tunnel joins the Wailoa River Power Station to the dam, 625 meters above. At F$234 million, it was the most expensive project ever initiated by the Fijian government. The river has an accompanying lake, one of two in Fiji.
