= Mount Buke Levu =

Mountain in Fiji

Coordinates: 19°07′48″S 177°58′48″E

Mount Buke Levu is the highest mountain on Kadavu Island in Fiji. Its height is 2,749 feet (838 m).
