= Paula Lacawai =

Fijian Chief and political leader

Ratu Paula Lacawai is a Fijian Chief and political leader. From 2001 to 2006, he represented the Province of Serua in the Senate as one of fourteen nominees of the Great Council of Chiefs.
