= List of diplomatic missions in Fiji =

This is a list of diplomatic missions in Fiji. The capital, Suva, hosts 26 embassies/high commissions, 1 embassy extension office, and 4 other missions/representative offices.

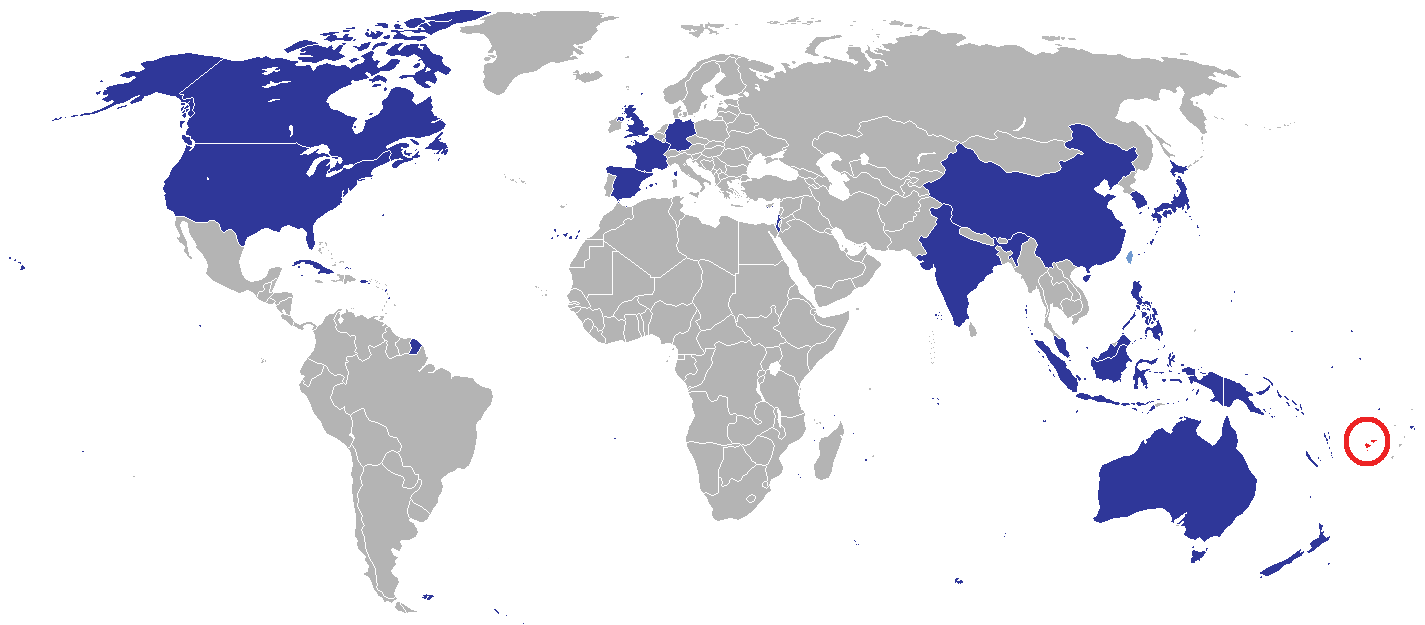
Map of diplomatic missions in Fiji

== Diplomatic missions in Suva ==
=== Embassies/High Commissions ===
Entries marked with an asterisk (*) are member-states of the Commonwealth of Nations. As such, their embassies are formally termed as "high commissions".

1. Australia*
2. Canada*
3. China
4. Cook Islands*
5. Cuba
6. France
7. Germany
8. India*
9. Indonesia
10. Israel
11. Japan
12. Kiribati*
13. Malaysia*
14. Marshall Islands
15. Micronesia
16. Nauru*
17. New Zealand*
18. Papua New Guinea*
19. Philippines
20. Samoa*
21. Solomon Islands*
22. South Korea
23. Tuvalu*
24. United Kingdom*
25. United States
26. Vanuatu*

=== Other missions/representative offices/delegations ===
1. European Union (Delegation)
2. Spain (Embassy office)
3. Republic of China (Taiwan) (Trade Office)
4. United Nations (Resident Coordinator's office)

== Non-Resident Embassies/High Commissions ==
Resident in Canberra, Australia:

- Algeria
- Argentina
- Austria
- Bangladesh
- Botswana
- Brazil
- Croatia
- Cyprus
- Czechia
- Denmark
- Egypt
- Estonia
- Finland
- Georgia
- Ghana
- Ireland
- Italy
- Kenya
- Kosovo
- Mexico
- Morocco
- Norway
- Palestine
- Poland
- Portugal
- Russia
- Saudi Arabia
- Serbia
- Slovenia
- Thailand
- Uganda
- Ukraine
- Venezuela
- Zimbabwe

Resident in Wellington, New Zealand:

- Chile
- Colombia
- Holy See
- Hungary
- Iran
- Kuwait
- Netherlands
- Spain
- South Africa
- Switzerland
- Turkey
- United Arab Emirates
- Vietnam

Resident in other cities:

- Armenia (Beijing)
- Bolivia (Tokyo)
- Dominican Republic (Tokyo)
- Ivory Coast (Seoul)
- Jamaica (Tokyo)
- Lesotho (Tokyo)
- Maldives (Kuala Lumpur)
- Malawi (Tokyo)
- Rwanda (Singapore)
- Senegal (Tokyo)
- Singapore (Singapore)
- Sweden (Stockholm)
- Tonga (Nuku’alofa)

== Missions to the United Nations in New York City Accredited to Fiji ==
- Afghanistan
- Andorra
- Antigua and Barbuda
- Bahrain
- Belarus
- Belize
- Benin
- Bhutan
- Brunei
- Bulgaria
- Burkina Faso
- Burundi
- Cameroon
- Cape Verde
- Central African Republic
- Chad
- Comoros
- Congo-Brazzaville
- Congo-Kinshasa
- Costa Rica
- Dominica
- Ecuador
- El Salvador
- Gabon
- Gambia
- Grenada
- Guatemala
- Guinea-Bissau
- Guinea
- Guyana
- Haiti
- Honduras
- Iraq
- Kazakhstan
- Kyrgyzstan
- Liberia
- Liechtenstein
- Lithuania
- Mali
- Malta
- Mauritania
- Monaco
- Mozambique
- Nicaragua
- Niger
- Panama
- Qatar
- Saint Kitts and Nevis
- Saint Lucia
- Saint Vincent and the Grenadines
- San Marino
- Seychelles
- Sierra Leone
- Somalia
- South Sudan
- Suriname
- Tajikistan
- Tanzania
- Togo
- Trinidad and Tobago
- Turkmenistan
- Uzbekistan
- Yemen
- Zambia

== Embassies to open ==
- Turkey
- United Arab Emirates
- Venezuela

== Closed missions ==
Palau (Embassy closed 28 February 2021)

== See also ==
- Foreign relations of Fiji
- List of diplomatic missions of Fiji
- Visa requirements for Fijian citizens
