= Watisone Lotawa =

- Born: Watisone Lotawa; 13 July 1979 (age 47) Fiji
- Height: 1.90 m (6 ft 3 in)
- Weight: 98 kg (15 st 6 lb)

Rugby union career
- Position: Wing/Fullback
Senior career
Years	Team	Apps	(Points)
- North Otago
2005-07	Southland	33	(40)
2008-	Auckland		

Watisone Lotawa is a New Zealand Rugby Union player who plays provincial rugby for Auckland in the Air New Zealand Cup

== Early career ==
Watisone Lotawa played for North Otago in the 3rd Division of the NPC, he was a member of the North Otago squad that won the 2002 3rd Division final against Horowhenua-Kapiti. After a couple of seasons for North Otago he took up a contract with Southland. He played 33 games for Southland and it was with them he played his first match in the Air New Zealand Cup.

== Auckland ==
Watisone Lotawa now plays in Auckland for clubside Suburbs, and he has been named in the 2008 Auckland side for the Air New Zealand Cup.
