= Mahatma Gandhi Memorial High School (Fiji) =

Secondary School in Fiji

Location
- Fletcher Road, Vatuwaqa; Suva, Rewa Province, Central Division; Fiji
- Coordinates: 18°07′29″S 178°27′33″E

Information
- School type: High School
- Established: 1960; 66 years ago
- Founder: Gujarat Education Society of Fiji
- Principal: Sanjay Raman (2019-present)
- Language: English
- Colors: Navy blue; Orange; White

Mahatma Gandhi Memorial High School (M.G.M) is a secondary school institution in Fiji. It is named formally after Mohandas Karamchand Gandhi, a political leader and activist of India during the late 1800s and early 1900s. It was established in 1960 and is managed by the Gujarat Education Society of Fiji. The current principal of the school is Sanjay Abhinash Raman.

It has 5 year levels (Year 9-13) with 6 streams from Year's 9 to 12 and 4 streams in Year 13. It is one of the best schools in Fiji in terms of academic performance and has lately received recognition in sports events. The school currently has a student staff population of approximately 1070+.

== History ==
Mahatma Gandhi High School was founded by the Gujarat Education Society in 1960. The society's first school was MGM Primary. MGM High School was opened in mid-1960 with Dhansukh Patel as the head teacher. A year later, Divesh Patel became the principal.

The Gujarat Education Society constructed six classrooms and a basement for the school students in 1996. Another two-story building was built for senior students along with classrooms, offices and washroom facilities.

In 2003, the new technological block was built. After a few years, the management built a new block consisting of a Home Economics Room, Agriculture Room, and Basic Technology Workshop.

In 2011 a new administrative room and a PEMAC department room were added.

In November 2020, a new complex costing over 5 million dollars was opened by Prime Minister Voreqe Bainimarama. The complex included a new pavilion, new labs with modern equipment as well as a new library and extra classrooms for technical drawing and other classes.

== Background ==
Mahatma Gandhi Memorial High School is a sister school of Nehru Primary School situated in Huon Street; Suva and Mahatma Gandhi Primary School situated in Rifle Range Road, Suva; and Indira Gandhi Memorial School in Samabula, Suva. All of these are managed by the Gujarat Society of Fiji. Mahatma Gandhi Memorial High School is a co-educational secondary school that provides education to its students from forms 3 to 7.

Named after Mahatma Gandhi, the school community emulates and practices Gandhian philosophy.
