= List of fossiliferous stratigraphic units in Fiji =

Group or Formation	Period	Notes
Futuna Limestone	Neogene	
Mba Group	Neogene	
Nakasi Formation	Quaternary	
Navosa Group	Neogene	
Ndalithoni Limestone	Neogene	
Ra Formation	Neogene	
Tokelau Formation	Neogene	
Tuatua Limestone	Neogene	

== See also ==
- Lists of fossiliferous stratigraphic units in Oceania
