= Apenisa Tuta Vodo =

- Born: Apenisa Tuta Vodo; 28 July 1970 (age 56) Suva, Fiji
- Height: 1.86 m (6 ft 1 in)
- Weight: 90 kg (200 lb)

Rugby union career
- Position(s): Centre, Wing
Amateur team(s)
Years	Team	Apps	(Points)
1997	North Shore		
Senior career
Years	Team	Apps	(Points)
1998	Rugby Rovato		
2002-2006	Calvisano		
2007-2008	Lazio		
Provincial / State sides
Years	Team	Apps	(Points)
1997	North Harbour		

Apenisa Tuta Vodo (born 28 July 1970) is a Fijian rugby union player and former Italian international.

== Early life ==
Vodo was born in Suva, Fiji.

== Career ==
He debuted in 1998 for Rugby Rovato

Vodo was one of the first Fijians to represent Italy internationally, the other being Manoa Vosawai. He was part of then Coach, John Kirwan's 34-man squad to play Argentina and Australia in November 2002. He played for Calvisano.
