= Mosese Bogisa =

Fijian cricketer

Personal information
- Born: 27 April 1922; Nadi, Fiji
- Batting: Right-handed

International information
- National side: Fiji

Career statistics
Competition	FC
Matches	6
Runs scored	152
Batting average	12.66
100s/50s	–/–
Top score	33
Balls bowled	–
Wickets	–
Bowling average	–
5 wickets in innings	–
10 wickets in match	–
Best bowling	–
Catches/stumpings	2/–
- Source: Cricinfo, 13 March 2010

Mosese Bogisa (born 27 April 1922, date of death unknown) was a Fijian former cricketer. Bogisa was a right-handed batsman.

Bogisa made his first-class debut for Fiji in 1948 against Auckland during Fiji's 1947/48 tour of New Zealand, where he played five first-class matches in total. Bogsia's final first-class match for Fiji came in their 1953/54 tour to New Zealand where he played a single first-class match against Otago.

In his 6 first-class matches for Fiji he scored 152 runs at a batting average of 12.66, with a high score of 33. Bogisa took 2 catches in the field.

Bogisa also represented Fiji in 15 non first-class matches from 1948 to 1954, with his final match for Fiji coming against Bay of Plenty during their 1953/54 tour of New Zealand.

Bogisa is deceased.
