= List of airlines of Fiji =

This is a list of airlines currently operating in Fiji.

Airline	IATA	ICAO	Callsign	Image	Commenced operations	Notes
Fiji Airways	FJ	FJI	FIJI		1947	Formerly Air Pacific
Fiji Link	PI	SUF			2013	Rebranded from Pacific Sun (2006–2014)
Island Hoppers						
Northern Air					2007	
Pacific Island Air					1999	
Sunflower Aviation					1980	

== See also ==
- List of airlines
- List of defunct airlines of Oceania
