= 2001 Fiji rugby union tour of Italy and France =

Summary
P	W	D	L
Total
4	2	0	2
Test match
2	0	0	2
Opponent
P	W	D	L
Italy
1	0	0	1
France
1	0	0	1

The 2001 Fiji rugby union tour of Italy and France was a series of matches played in November 2001 in Italy and France by Fiji national rugby union team.

== Results ==
Scores and results list Fiji's points tally first.

Opposing Team	For	Against	Date	Venue	Status
Emerging Italy	33	23	8 November 2001	Mirano	Tour match
Italy	10	66	10 November 2001	Monigo, Treviso	Test match
French Barbarians	17	15	18 November 2001	Toulon, Toulon	Tour match
France	10	77	24 November 2001	St. Geoffroy-Guichard, Saint-Étienne	Test match
