= Acolastodes =

Scientific classification
- Kingdom: Animalia
- Phylum: Arthropoda
- Clade: Pancrustacea
- Class: Insecta
- Order: Lepidoptera
- Family: Pyralidae
- Subfamily: Phycitinae
- Genus: Acolastodes; Meyrick, 1934
- Species: A. oenotripta

Binomial name
- Acolastodes oenotripta Meyrick, 1934

Genus of moths

Acolastodes is a monotypic snout moth genus in the subfamily Phycitinae. Its only species, Acolastodes oenotripta, is found in Fiji. Both the genus and the species were described by Edward Meyrick in 1934.
