= Jörg Zimmermann =

German diplomat (born 1944)

Joerg Zimmermann
- Born: 1944 (age 81–82); Neustadt an der Weinstrasse, Rhineland-Palatinate, Germany
- Occupation: Diplomat

Jörg Zimmermann (born 1944, in Neustadt an der Weinstrasse, Germany) is a German diplomat, who served as Germany's ambassador to New Zealand from 2005 to 2009. He is also accredited as ambassador to Fiji.

== Career ==
Zimmermann has been employed in the German Foreign Service since 1976, when he was appointed as the economic attaché at the German embassy in Beijing, China. He has held the following positions:

- Press and cultural attaché in Manila, Philippines (1981–1984)
- Assistant head of the South East Asia Division of the Foreign (1984–1987)
- Deputy consul-general Osaka-Kobe, Japan (1987–1990)
- Deputy head of the East Asia Division of the Foreign Office (1990–1994)
- Deputy head of mission to the German embassy in Algiers, Algeria (1994 and 1995)
- Consul-general to Canton, China (1995–1997)
- Head of the Foreign Affairs Department in the Office of the President of Germany (1998–2001)
- Minister for political affairs at the German embassy in Tokyo, Japan (2001–2005)

Zimmermann took up his present post of ambassador to Wellington in October 2005. Accredited to Fiji, he duly presented his credentials to acting president Ratu Joni Madraiwiwi on 25 January 2006.

== Personal life ==
Zimmermann is married and has two children.
