= Sakiusa Sing =

Sakiusa Michael Kue Sing (22 August 1946 – 22 December 2005) was an educator in Fiji. Born on Koro Island of Fijian and Chinese descent, Sing was considered a pioneer of Catholic education in Fiji.

== Life ==
Sing was educated at the Nabasovi Primary School on Koro and then at the Marist Convent School in Levuka before undertaking his secondary education at the St John's College, Cawaci. After Cawaci, he went on to Corpus Christi Teachers College in Suva where he completed a Diploma in Teaching (Primary) and later a Secondary Conversion diploma. He also received a Bachelor of Arts degree (Education) from the University of the South Pacific.

Sing started his teaching career at Savarekareka in Savusavu and went on to become the founding principal of Wairiki Secondary School in Taveuni - up to then, only a Junior Secondary School. He then went on to also be the founding principal at the Bemana Junior Secondary School in Sigatoka and Lomary Secondary School, and the first lay principal of St John's College in Cawaci.

In addition, he served for 5 years (1995 to 1999) as the Principal of Corpus Christi Teachers College, the Archdiocese of Suva's primary teachers' college. Prior to this, Sakiusa waso the first lay and longest serving Director of Catholic Education in Fiji.

Sing was married to Maria (née Waititi), also a teacher by profession and now retired in Suva, Fiji. They have 5 children and 12 grandchildren.

Sing lost his long battle with cancer on 22 December 2005 and was buried at the Chinese Cemetery in Suva on 28 December 2005 at the age of 59.
