= Savu Viliame =

Fijian cricketer

Personal information
- Full name: Savu Mataika Viliame

International information
- National side: Fiji

Career statistics
Competition	FC
Matches	3
Runs scored	50
Batting average	16.66
100s/50s	–/–
Top score	14*
Balls bowled	562
Wickets	11
Bowling average	19.27
5 wickets in innings	1
10 wickets in match	–
Best bowling	6/34
Catches/stumpings	–/–
- Source: Cricinfo, 14 March 2010

Savu Mataika Viliame (born 1906 at Lau Islands, Fiji; died 1986 at Ono-i-Lau, Fiji) was a Fijian cricketer.

Viliame made his first-class debut for Fiji in 1948 against Auckland during Fiji's 1947/48 tour of New Zealand, where he played two first-class matches during the tour against Wellington and Auckland.

In his 3 first-class matches for Fiji he scored 50 runs at a batting average of 16.66, with a high score of 14*. With the ball he took 11 wickets at a bowling average of 19.27, with a single five wicket haul against Wellington in where he took 6/34 in Weelington's first innings.

Viliame also represented Fiji in 3 non first-class matches for Fiji on their 1947/48 tour.

Viliame died in 1986 at Ono-i-Lau, Fiji.
