= List of universities in Fiji =

This is a list of universities in Fiji.

- University of the South Pacific (Suva)
- University of Fiji (Lautoka)
- Fiji National University (Suva)
