= Timoci Naivaluwaqa =

Fijian trade unionist (1953–2006)

Timoci Naivaluwaqa (1953 – 16 January 2006) was a Fijian trade unionist and a founding member of the Fiji Labour Party in 1985.

Naivaluwaqa was General Secretary of the Fiji Hotel and Catering Union FHCU from 1999 till his death, and also served as President of the Fiji Trades Union Congress. Prior to working for the FHCU, Naivaluwaqa worked in the sugar industry and was based in Labasa.

He was married to Susie; they had four children.

Naivaluwaqa died of kidney failure on 16 January 2006 at the age of 52.
