= Futsal in Fiji =

Futsal has become very popular in Fiji since the mid-1990s. It is a game similar to football, played on a smaller pitch; often indoors. Regular tournaments are frequently held by local organizers. Players form teams and play in pool matches leading to semis and finals. Currently Futsal pitches in Fiji are mostly located in the Capital City Suva. The major pitches are the Vodafone Arena and the Tattersells Leisure Centre.

Futsal is generally played in a rectangular field (approx. 38m * 18m). There are two teams, each with a maximum of 5 members. A match has a referee who enforces the laws of the game. A typical match lasts about 20 minutes. The game is played by each team scoring a goal. A goal is scored when the ball passed over the goal line between the goalposts and under the crossbar. Team that scores the maximum goals in the specified time wins the match.

Futsal in Fiji has gained traction in recent years through the efforts of the Fiji Football Association (Fiji FA) and the Oceania Football Confederation (OFC). The focus has been on building the sport from the grassroots level, integrating it into schools, and increasing participation. Efforts have included setting up regional leagues, coaching courses, and training programs aimed at developing both male and female players. Fiji FA aims to enhance the sport’s professionalism by creating a pathway for players to represent Fiji at international futsal tournaments, including the OFC Futsal Nations Cup and potentially the FIFA Futsal World Cup.

In addition to player development, there is a significant emphasis on futsal coaching programs in Fiji. Fiji FA, supported by FIFA and OFC, has organized coaching courses to educate local coaches and improve the level of play. Coaches are encouraged to return to their communities to promote futsal and develop young talent. Recent tournaments, such as the Inter-District Championship, have helped boost the sport’s profile by offering a more competitive environment.
