= List of World War I aces from Fiji =

The list of World War I flying aces born in Fiji contains one name.

- Clive Brewster-Joske, 8 confirmed aerial victories.
