= Confederation of Public Sector Unions (Fiji) =

The Confederation of Public Sector Unions was founded by trade unions operating in the Fiji public service during the early 1980s when they needed to approach their common employer, the Fiji Public Service Commission, on common industrial relations matters. The commission, by conduct, recognised the Confederation as the umbrella organisation or voice of all unionised workers within the Fiji public service. Both sides adopted a pragmatic approach in order to streamline contact, meeting and even execution of documents on agreed items, by holding joint meetings, instead of separate and repetitious contacts.

In April 2006, CPSU negotiated a five-year memorandum of agreement with Prime Minister Laisenia Qarase over payment and cost-of-living adjustments.

== Composition ==
In 2007, there are four active trade unions in CPSU:

- Fiji Public Service Association [FPSA]
- Fiji Teachers Union [FTU]
- Fiji Nursing Association [FNA]
- Air Traffic Management Association of Fiji [ATMAF]

The General Secretary of FPSA serves as the Chairperson of the CPSU. The Senior Industrial Relations Officer [SIRO] of FPSA assumes the role of Spokesperson of CPSU.
