= Taininbeka =

Atoll in the Ringgold Isles, Fiji

Native name: Tai ni mbeka
- Location within Fiji

Geography
- Location: South Pacific Ocean
- Coordinates: 16.0833121°S 179.1602998°W
- Archipelago: Ringgold Isles
- Area: 0.144 km^{2} (0.056 sq mi)

Administration
- Fiji
- Division: Eastern Division
- Province: Cakaudrove
- Tikina: Wainikeli

Demographics
- Population: 0

Additional information
- Time zone: FJT (UTC+12)
  - Summer (DST): FJST (UTC+13)

Taininbeka is an atoll in Fiji, a member of the Ringgold Isles archipelago, which forms an outlier group to the northern island of Vanua Levu. This uninhabited islet is situated at 16.04° South and 179.09° East, and has a total land area of 144.34ha.

== See also ==
- Desert island
- List of islands
