= Syzygium minus =

Conservation status
- Data Deficient (IUCN 3.1)

Scientific classification
- Kingdom: Plantae
- Clade: Tracheophytes
- Clade: Angiosperms
- Clade: Eudicots
- Clade: Rosids
- Order: Myrtales
- Family: Myrtaceae
- Genus: Syzygium
- Species: S. minus

Binomial name
- Syzygium minus A.C.Sm.

Species of flowering plant

Syzygium minus is a species of flowering plant in the family Myrtaceae. It is a tree endemic to Fiji. It is a small tree, 1.8 to 2.5 meters high, which is known only from the Mt. Evans range on Viti Levu. It grows in crest thickets in tropical moist forest from 760 to 850 metres elevation.

The species was described by Albert Charles Smith in 1985.
