= Lewalevu =

Lewalevu (also Lewa-Levu, or "The Great Woman") is a fertility goddess in Fijian mythology.
