= Sangeeta Niranjan =

Sangeeta Niranjan is an Indo-Fijian businesswoman. She is the co-founder of Kenns Motors, the President of the Fiji Motor Traders Association, and a former President of the Fiji Employers Federation, a position to which she was elected on 3 September 2005. She resigned from this position on 30 October 2006 for personal reasons.
