= Manoj Kumar (chess player) =

Fijian chess player (born 1977)

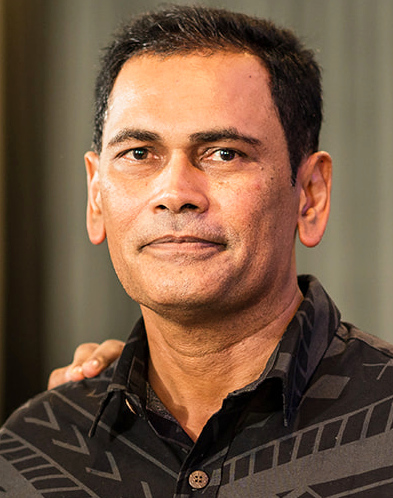

Personal information
- Born: October 16, 1977 (age 48)

Chess career
- Country: Fiji
- Title: Candidate Master (2009)
- Peak rating: 2040 (January 2010)

Manoj Kumar (Fijian: Manoji Kumar, born 16 October 1977) is a Fijian chess player who has won the Fiji National Championship eight times: 1998, 1999, 2000, 2003, 2007, 2008, 2009, and 2010. The Fiji Sports Councils Awards named him Fiji national domestic Player of the year twice, in 2007 and 2008.

Kumar won the first Fiji Invitational Championship in 2003.

Kumar represented Fiji in the most Oceania championships: 2001; 2007 Nadi, Fiji; 2009 Gold Coast; and 2011 Rotoura, New Zealand. Kumar also represented Fiji in three Chess Olympiads.
