= Rusiate Nayacakalou =

Fijian anthropologist

Rusiate Nayacakalou OBE (1927 – 6 February 1972) was a Fijian social anthropologist. His work illustrated the ways in which anthropological reflexivity can inspire moral critique from its subjects when a critical stance toward tradition is mistaken as an attack on indigenous sovereignty.

== Biography ==
Nayacakalou joined the Fijian public service where his excellent academic potential was recognised by the colonial government and was sent for tertiary education in New Zealand. He completed a bachelor's degree at the University of Auckland in 1956, before becoming a lecturer and researcher at the university. He later joined University of London, graduating with a doctorate in 1963.

Nayacakalou worked as a lecturer at the University of Sydney, before returning to Fiji in 1964 to implement administrative reforms agreed by the Great Council of Chiefs. In 1969 he was appointed the first Fijian manager of the island's Native Land Trust Board.

He was awarded an OBE in the 1971 Birthday Honours. His citation read "The general acceptance and successful implementation of the important reforms of the Fijian Administration are largely the works of Dr Nayacakalou and in this achievement he has made a significant contribution to the future of his people and the dominion."

Nayacakalou died in February 1972 at the age of 45 after a heart attack, and was survived by his wife and six children.

Following his death, the Polynesian Society of the University of Auckland created a medal named in his honour, recognising distinguished scholarly publications on the island communities of Polynesia. The Nayacakalou Medal was designed by Robert Ellis, and was awarded for the first time in the centennial year of the society in 1986.
