= Samulayo =

God or spirit of war in Fiji mythology

In the mythology of Fiji, Samulayo is a god or spirit of war and the souls who die in battle.

He lives in the underworld.
