= Syzygium amplifolium =

Conservation status
- Least Concern (IUCN 3.1)

Scientific classification
- Kingdom: Plantae
- Clade: Tracheophytes
- Clade: Angiosperms
- Clade: Eudicots
- Clade: Rosids
- Order: Myrtales
- Family: Myrtaceae
- Genus: Syzygium
- Species: S. amplifolium

Binomial name
- Syzygium amplifolium L.M.Perry

Species of flowering plant

Syzygium amplifolium is a species of flowering plant in the family Myrtaceae. It is a shrub or tree endemic to southern Viti Levu in Fiji. It is threatened by habitat loss.
