= Aquaculture in Fiji =

Aquaculture in Fiji has not been developed on a large scale, the milkfish being the only species cultured widely. A Fijian prawn farm aimed to produce 25 tonnes of Penaeidae in 1990, but did not even make it to the halfway mark in their goal. Most aquacultural attempts in Fiji have aimed to cultivate high-value species for commercial exportation, however the country has not been able to compete with the aquaculture industry already developed in the rest of Southeast Asia.
