= Flaming Teeth =

Creature form Fijian mythology

Flaming Teeth, from Fijian mythology, was a giant who was so large his teeth appeared as burning logs.

The colossal creature terrorized villages relentlessly, devouring people and causing widespread destruction. After enduring countless attacks and losses, a group of courageous villagers banded together. They devised a strategy to ambush the giant, enticing it beneath a massive rock and delivering a fatal blow to its skull. They succeeded killing the giant but its teeth still were aflame. The villagers took the teeth back to the village and that was the first time man acquired the use of fire.
