= Syzygium fijiense =

Conservation status
- Least Concern (IUCN 3.1)

Scientific classification
- Kingdom: Plantae
- Clade: Tracheophytes
- Clade: Angiosperms
- Clade: Eudicots
- Clade: Rosids
- Order: Myrtales
- Family: Myrtaceae
- Genus: Syzygium
- Species: S. fijiense

Binomial name
- Syzygium fijiense L.M.Perry

Synonyms
- Syzygium rubescens var. koroense L.M.Perry

Species of flowering plant

Syzygium fijiense is a species of flowering plant in the family Myrtaceae. It is a tree endemic to Fiji. It grows 10 to 25 metres tall in dense lowland tropical moist forest and forest patches from 50 to 750 metres elevation.

The species was described by Lily May Perry in 1950.
