= Bangladesh–Fiji relations =

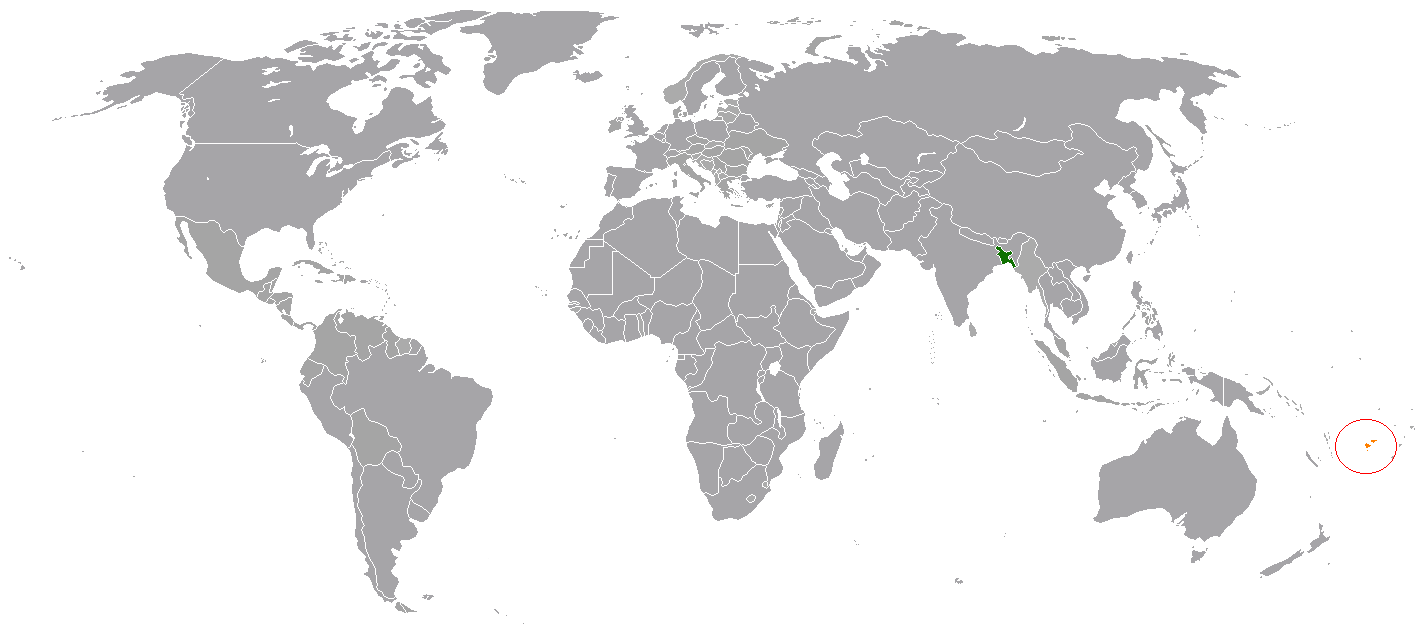

- Bangladesh: Fiji

Bangladesh–Fiji relations refer to the bilateral relations between Bangladesh and Fiji. Fiji recognized Bangladesh on January 31, 1972. Diplomatic relations between the two countries were officially established in 2003. Both countries are members of the Commonwealth of Nations. In 2013, the Foreign Minister of Bangladesh urged the Fijian government to steer the country towards democracy.

== Agriculture ==
Bangladesh and Fiji are considering signing a memorandum of understanding on agricultural development through which Bangladesh will provide its agricultural technology to Fiji.

== Cultural relations ==
In 2014, Fiji signed a memorandum of understanding with the Bangladesh Rugby Union to help develop rugby in Bangladesh. The assistance is set to commence with the Fiji-Bangladesh Friendship Rugby tournament to be held in February 2015.

== Economic relations ==
Both Bangladesh and Fiji have shown deep interest in expanding the bilateral economic activities between the two countries. Because of the efficient business registration procedures in Fiji, Bangladeshi investors have shown their interest to invest in Fiji. The textiles industries has been identified as a potential sector for Bangladeshi businessmen to invest in Fiji. Other potential sectors include medical, information and communication technology.

In 2007, the Bangladeshi High Commissioner to Fiji met with Fiji's Health Minister to discuss the bulk export of Bangladeshi pharmaceuticals.

In 2019, Bangladesh exported $2.61M to Fiji. The main products exported from Bangladesh to Fiji were apparel and knit, and pharmaceutical products. On the same year, Fiji exported $985k to Bangladesh. The main product exported from Fiji to Bangladesh was scrap iron. Pran also exports consumer items to Fiji and a number of other pacific Islands.

In the 2020-21 fiscal year, Bangladesh's exports to Fiji reached US$2.64million.

== Bangladeshis in Fiji ==
As of 2019, there were around 3,000 Bangladeshis living in Fiji, mainly employed in the garments industry, hospitality and other service sectors. In addition, there were at least 17,000 Bengali-speaking people who arrived in Fiji between 1879 and 1916 during the colonial rule. In 2019 and 2021, some Bangladeshi expatriates complained about abuses in their work places and exploitation by their employers.
