= Morgan Simmons =

Fijian cricketer

Personal information
- Full name: Morgan Fleet Simmons
- Born: 21 May 1924; Labasa, Macuata Province, Fiji
- Died: November 18, 1983 (aged 59); Labasa, Macuata Province, Fiji
- Bowling: Right-arm medium-fast

International information
- National side: Fiji

Career statistics
Competition	FC
Matches	4
Runs scored	44
Batting average	14.66
100s/50s	–/–
Top score	16
Balls bowled	528
Wickets	4
Bowling average	76.00
5 wickets in innings	–
10 wickets in match	–
Best bowling	1/42
Catches/stumpings	1/–
- Source: Cricinfo, 14 March 2010

Morgan Fleet Simmons (May 21, 1924 - November 18, 1983) is a former Fijian cricketer. Simmons was a right-arm fast-medium bowler.

Simmons made his first-class debut for Fiji in 1954 against Otago during Fiji's 1953/54 tour of New Zealand. During the tour he played three further first-class matches, with his final first-class match for Fiji coming against Auckland.

In his 4 first-class matches for Fiji he scored 44 runs at a batting average of 14.66, with a high score of 16. With the ball he took 4 wickets at a bowling average of 76.00, with best figures of 1/42. In the field Simmons took a single catch.

Simmons also represented Fiji in 9 non first-class matches in their 1953/54 tour.
