= Syzygium seemannianum =

Conservation status
- Near Threatened (IUCN 3.1)

Scientific classification
- Kingdom: Plantae
- Clade: Tracheophytes
- Clade: Angiosperms
- Clade: Eudicots
- Clade: Rosids
- Order: Myrtales
- Family: Myrtaceae
- Genus: Syzygium
- Species: S. seemannianum

Binomial name
- Syzygium seemannianum Merr. & L.M.Perry (1942)

Synonyms
- Eugenia rivularis Seem. (1865), nom. illeg.

Species of flowering plant

Syzygium seemannianum is a species of flowering plant in the family Myrtaceae. It is a shrub or tree endemic to Fiji.

It is found on five of the high islands of the Fijian archipelago, where it is locally abundant in forests and thickets near streams.
