= Netani Suka =

Fiji international rugby league footballer

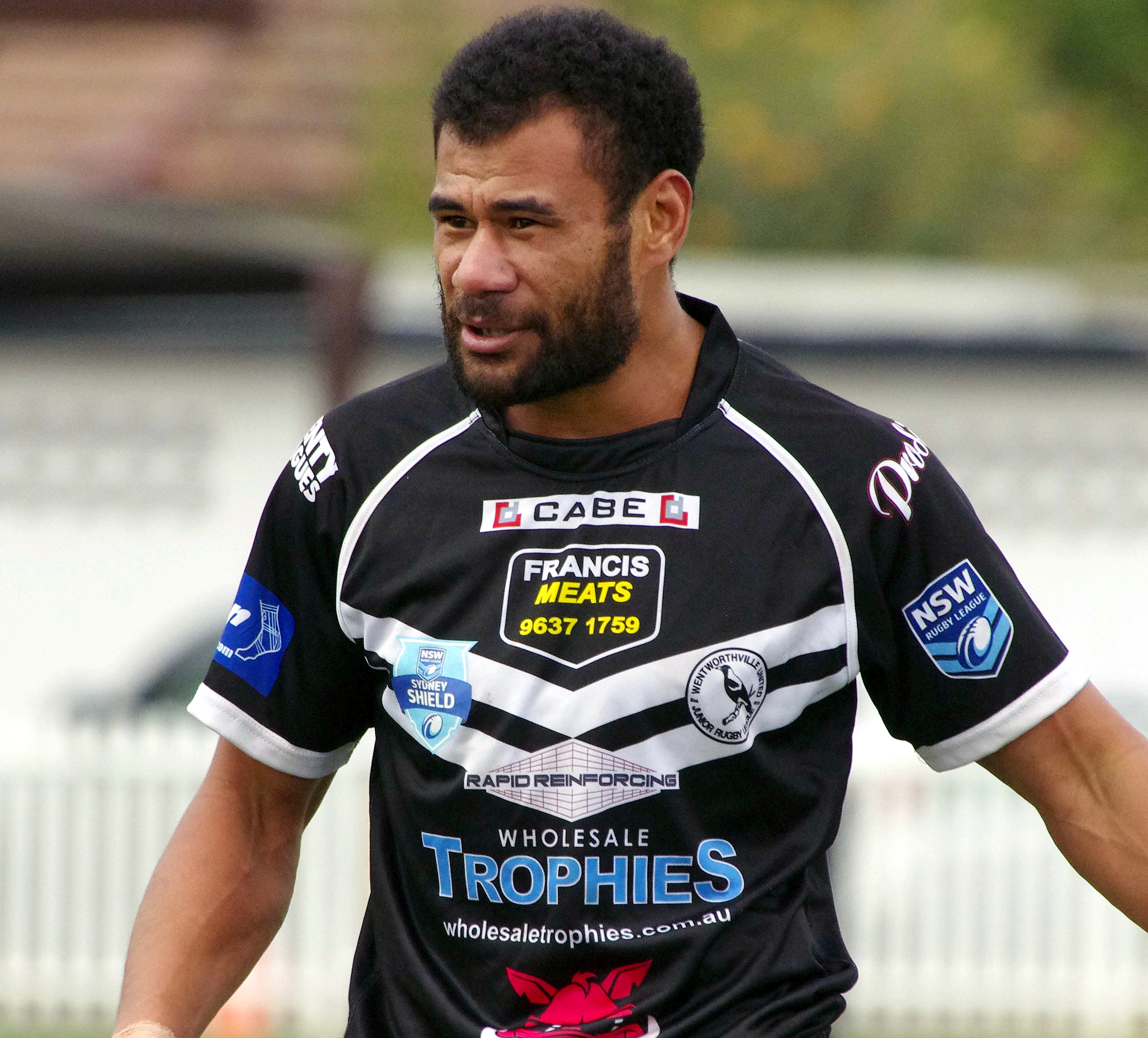

Personal information
- Born: Fiji

Playing information
- Position: Second-row, Prop
Club
Years	Team	Pld	T	G	FG	P
	Gateshead Thunder
Representative
Years	Team	Pld	T	G	FG	P
2006	Fiji	1	0	0	0	0
- Source: As of 24 June 2017

Netani Suka, also known by the nickname of "T", is a Fijian professional rugby league footballer who currently plays for the Wentworthville Magpies in the Bundaberg Red Cup. He plays in the second-row. He is a Fijian international. He has previously played Premier League for the Wests Tigers and Penrith Panthers and for the Gateshead Thunder in National League Two.

He was named in the Fiji training squad for the 2008 Rugby League World Cup and played for Fiji Bati ahead of the 2013 Rugby League World Cup.
