= Maculeku Rokocegu =

Fijian chief

Ratu Maculeku Rokocegu is a Fijian chief. The Paramount Chief of the Dreketi sub-district of Macuata Province, Rokocegu was involved in a mutiny at the Sukunaivalu Barracks in Labasa on 7 July 2000. Supporting the insurrection in Suva led by George Speight, rebels overran the Sukunaivalu Barracks, and also harassed Indo-Fijian civilians and led acts of civil disobedience within the surrounding area.

Radio New Zealand reported on 25 June 2003 that Rokocegu had expressed great remorse for his actions, and publicly apologised to his people for participating in the mutiny. He had also apologised, on behalf of the people in the district, to the Indo-Fijian community at a reconciliation ceremony. Expressing his change of heart, he announced that the words Indo-Fijian and Kai-India would no longer be used in his district; all residents of all races would now be known as Kai-Dreketi (People of Dreketi). Indian settlements, he declared, would be integrated into the Fijian village system. He encouraged all such settlements to choose a Turaga-ni-koro (village chief) like the indigenous Fijian villages.
