= 2000 Italy rugby union tour of Oceania =

Summary
P	W	D	L
Total
4	0	0	4
Test match
2	0	0	2
Opponent
P	W	D	L
Western Samoa
1	0	0	1
Fiji
1	0	0	1

The 2000 Italy rugby union tour was a series of matches played in July 2000 in Samoa and Fiji by the Italy national rugby union team. It was the first tour after their debut in the Six Nations Championship, and with the new coach Brad Johnstone. The Italians suffered losses in all four games. The team was very renewed due to the international retirement by Diego Dominguez and Alessandro Troncon, that came back only in November.

== Results ==
'Scores and results list Italy's points tally first.

Opposing Team	For	Against	Date	Venue	Status
Samoa province	26	29	5 July 2000	Apia	Tour match
Samoa	24	43	8 July 2000	Apia	Test match
Fiji Provinces	18	34	12 July 2000	Sigatoka	Tour match
Fiji	9	43	15 July 2000	Churchill Park, Lautoka	Test match
