= Bodybuilding in Fiji =

- Country: Fiji
- National team(s): Fiji

Bodybuilding in Fiji has a national governing organisation, and Fijian bodybuilders compete in international events.

== History ==
The 2016 South Pacific Bodybuilding Championship was held in Tahiti. Jekesoni Yanuyanudrua claimed Gold in the under-90 kg category whilst Harvey Ligairi claimed Gold in the under-85 kg category. Elizabeth Maki attained silver medal in the women's physique under-165 cm and in the body building under-55 kg category.
The 2015 Pacific Games were held in Papua New Guinea. Maryann Ma'afu-Moss won Silver and Haifa Haifa won Bronze in the female division. Harvey Ligairi and Tasi Biliwaqa won Silver and Jekesoni Yanuyanudrua won Bronze in the male division.
The 2011 Pacific Games were held in Nouméa, New Caledonia. A member of the Fiji national team won a gold medal at the Games.

== Governance ==
The national governing organization for the sport is the Fiji Bodybuilding & Fitness Federation. The country has a national organization that is recognized by both the World Bodybuilding Federation and the International Federation of Bodybuilding and Fitness as a national federation, representing the country's bodybuilding community. Jordon Boddam-Whetham is the President; Ronal Rishay Dip is the Treasurer and Vijit Anand Prasad is the Secretary of the Federation.
