= Dreketi River =

River in Vanua Levu, Fiji

Coordinates: 16°34′S 178°52′E

The Dreketi River is located in the island of Vanua Levu in Fiji. It is 65 kilometers in length and the deepest river in Fiji. It is navigable for small crafts for 35 kilometers from its mouth and provides access to large tracts of fertile land through which it passes.
