= Semi Ravouvou =

Fijian cricketer

Personal information
- Full name: Semi Ravouvou Ravouvou

International information
- National side: Fiji

Career statistics
| Competition | FC |
|---|---|
| Matches | 1 |
| Runs scored | 8 |
| Batting average | 4.00 |
| 100s/50s | –/– |
| Top score | 6 |
| Balls bowled | 28 |
| Wickets | – |
| Bowling average | – |
| 5 wickets in innings | – |
| 10 wickets in match | – |
| Best bowling | – |
| Catches/stumpings | –/– |
- Source: Cricinfo, 13 March 2010

Semi Ravouvou Ravouvou (birth date unknown – circa 1967) was a Fijian cricketer.

Ravouvou played a single first-class appearance for the Fiji in 1948 against Auckland during Fiji's tour of New Zealand. During the match he scored eight runs in the match.

During the same tour Ravouvou played six non first-class matches for Fiji, with his final match on tour coming against Bay of Plenty.

Ravouvou's exact date of birth is unknown, only that he died circa 1967 at Saunaka, Nadi.
