= Naitini Tuiyau =

Fijian cricketer and rugby union player

Personal information
- Full name: Naitini N Tuiyau
- Born: 16 June 1915; Navatau, Fiji
- Died: 1 March 2002 (aged 86)
- Batting: Right-handed

International information
- National side: Fiji

Career statistics
Competition	FC
Matches	4
Runs scored	170
Batting average	21.25
100s/50s	–/–
Top score	33
Balls bowled	6
Wickets	–
Bowling average	–
5 wickets in innings	–
10 wickets in match	–
Best bowling	–
Catches/stumpings	4/–
- Source: Cricinfo, 14 March 2010

Naitini N Tuiyau (June 16, 1915 - March 1, 2002) was a Fijian cricketer and rugby union player.

Tuiyau was a right-handed batsman who made his first-class debut for Fiji in 1954 against Otago during Fiji's 1953/54 tour of New Zealand. During the tour, he played three further first-class matches, with his final first-class match for Fiji coming against Auckland.

In his 4 first-class matches for Fiji, he scored 170 runs at a batting average of 21.25, with a high score of 33. In the field Tuiyau took 4 catches.

Tuiyau also represented Fiji in 10 non first-class matches for Fiji in 1954. Tuiyau's final match for Fiji came against Bay of Plenty during the 1953/54 tour.

In rugby union he played as a scrum-half and featured in five Test matches for Fiji, two against Tonga in 1947 and three against New Zealand Maori the following year.
