= John Icha Lal =

Fijian footballer and coach

John Icha Lal (born 24 February 1933 in Suva, Fiji) was formerly a player, captain and coach of the Fiji national football team.

He was coach of the Fiji national football team from 1977 to 1978.
