= Kiniviliame Radaveta =

Fijian rugby union footballer (born 1975)

Kiniviliame Radaveta (born 17 March 1975 in Naitasiri, Fiji) is a Fijian rugby union footballer, who has played at flanker, centre, and hooker. He has been capped once for Fiji in a match against neighbours Tonga.

At a young age he played rugby at Nadarivatu Junior Secondary School, representing the school from under 17 level to under 19.

After school, he joined his village team and was later selected to play for his province Naitasiri, who went on to win Telecom Fiji Cup.

Kini, as he is called used to play as flanker for his old club, Hydro, in Fiji in 15's. Kini was selected to play for Fiji in the IRB World Sevens Series by former national sevens coach Tomasi Cama for the 2001-2002 season.

He has played in Hong Kong for the DeA Tigers and in 2010 was the captain of the Hydro team in Fiji. He later coached the Hydro 7s team.
