= Viria Sugar Mill =

The Colonial Sugar Refining Company built a mill at Viria, on the Rewa River, on the southern side of the island of Viti Levu in Fiji. It crushed from 1886 to 1895 and was closed because it was too small to be viable. Sugarcane grown along the Waidina River (a tributary of the Rewa) was transported by rail to the Viria mill through a tunnel in a nearby hill range.
