= Scaevola floribunda =

Conservation status
- Least Concern (IUCN 2.3)

Scientific classification
- Kingdom: Plantae
- Clade: Tracheophytes
- Clade: Angiosperms
- Clade: Eudicots
- Clade: Asterids
- Order: Asterales
- Family: Goodeniaceae
- Genus: Scaevola
- Species: S. floribunda

Binomial name
- Scaevola floribunda A.Gray

Species of flowering plant

Scaevola floribunda is a species of plant in the family Goodeniaceae. It is endemic to Fiji.
