= Tomasi Naidole =

Fiji international rugby footballer

- Born: Tomasi Naidole; 4 July 1930 Yako, Fiji
- Died: 2005 (aged 74–75) England
- Height: 6 ft 2 in (1.88 m)
- Weight: 13 st 3 lb (84 kg)

Rugby union career
- Position: Wing
International career
Years	Team	Apps	(Points)
1954–59	Fiji		
- Rugby league career

Playing information
- Position: Wing
Club
Years	Team	Pld	T	G	FG	P
1964–68	Huddersfield

Tomasi Naidole (1930 – 2005) was a Fijian rugby union and professional rugby league footballer who played as a wing.

Naidole started his career in rugby union, representing the Fiji national team between 1954 and 1959. In 1964, he moved to England and switched codes to play rugby league for Huddersfield.

His two sons, Joe and Tom, also went on to play rugby league at Huddersfield.
