= Housing Authority of Fiji =

The Housing Authority of Fiji is in the business of providing homes to the people of Fiji. The authority sells fully serviced residential lots and offers residential mortgage loans for residential purposes.

When it was first established, the housing authority's mission was to enable workers to purchase or lease affordable homes. Since 1996, however, the Public Enterprise Act has required the HA to operate as a "successful business", putting it in conflict with its original mandate.
