= Nemani Kavuru =

Fijian cricketer (1928–2014)

Personal information
- Born: 8 April 1928; Tailevu Province, Fiji
- Died: January 2014 (aged 85)
- Batting: Right-handed
- Bowling: Right-arm medium

International information
- National side: Fiji

Career statistics
Competition	FC
Matches	2
Runs scored	41
Batting average	13.66
100s/50s	–/–
Top score	22
Balls bowled	210
Wickets	3
Bowling average	28.33
5 wickets in innings	–
10 wickets in match	–
Best bowling	1/6
Catches/stumpings	1/–
- Source: Cricinfo, 14 March 2010

Nemani Kavuru (8 April 1928 – January 2014) was a Fijian cricketer. Kavuru was a right-handed batsman who bowled right-arm medium pace.

Kavuru made his first-class debut for Fiji in 1954 against Wellington during Fiji's 1953/54 tour of New Zealand. During the tour he a further first-class match against Auckland, which was his final first-class match for Fiji.

In his 2 first-class matches for Fiji he scored 41 runs at a batting average of 13.66, with a high score of 22. With the ball he took 3 wickets at a bowling average of 28.33, with best figures of 1/6. In the field Kavuru took a single catch.

Kavuru also represented Fiji in 10 non first-class matches in their 1953/54 tour of New Zealand, with his final match for Fiji coming against Bay of Plenty.

Kavuru died in January 2014, at the age of 85.
