= 1990 Fiji rugby union tour of Hong Kong and France =

Rugby tournament in 1990

Summary
P	W	D	L
Total
5	4	0	1
Test match
1	1	0	0
Opponent
P	W	D	L
Hong Kong
1	1	0	0

The 1990 Fiji rugby union tour of Hong Kong and France was a series of matches played in December 1990 in Hong Kong and France by the Fiji national rugby union team.

The matches played in France were valid for the "Toulouse Centenary International Masters".

== Results ==
5 December 1990

Hong Kong	6 - 54	Fiji

Hong Kong

11 December 1990

HK Chairman XV	9 - 77	Fiji XV

Hong Kong

16 December 1990

Wellington	9 - 30	Fiji XV

Toulouse

20 December 1990

Queensland	22 - 12	Fiji XV

Toulouse

22 December 1990

Bath	19 - 60	Fiji XV

Toulouse
