= Fiji Mission to the European Union =

The Fiji Mission to the European Union is responsible for Fiji's diplomatic relations with the European Union and with all member countries, except those with which Fiji maintains specific diplomatic relations, such as the United Kingdom.

The Mission, which was first established in July 1973, is based in Brussels, Belgium, and doubles as Fiji's Embassy to Belgium. The Head of Mission to the European Union, currently [H.E Mr Deo Saran], also holds the title of Ambassador to Belgium. He is assisted by Counsellor (Mr Nidhendra Pratap SINGH, who is responsible for agriculture and trade) and First Secretary, Mr Mesake LEDUA. In addition, there are three supporting staff.

The main focus of the Mission is to promote Fiji's trading interests and gain markets for Fiji's sugar through such agreements as the Lomé Convention and the Cotonou Agreement. It has also helped negotiate tariff concessions and preferential market quotas for the export of garments and canned tuna to European countries.

== List of heads of mission ==
The following individuals have held office as Head of Mission to the European Union.

Order	Chief Justice	Term of office
1.	Sir Josaia Rabukawaqa [1]	1973–1976
2.	Satya Nandan	8 November 1976 – 1983
3.	J.D. Cavalevu	1983–1985
4.	Poseci Bune	1985–1987
5.	Kaliopate Tavola	1988–1998
6.	Isikeli Mataitoga	1998–2004
7.	Ratu Seremaia Tui Cavuilati	2004–2009
8.	Peceli Vocea	2009–2014
Rabukawaqa, who was Fiji's High Commissioner to the United Kingdom, was accredited as Head of Mission to the European Union and as Ambassador to Belgium, but was not resident.
