= Saraswati College =

Location
- Dilkusha, Nausori; Fiji
- Coordinates: 18.0368°S 178.5163°E

Information
- Type: Secondary School
- Enrollment: ~500

Saraswati College is a secondary school in Dilkusha, Nausori in Fiji. The school has about 500+ students, and includes both academic programs and co-curricula activities.

The school celebrated its golden jubilee in 2016.
