= Mataika House =

Building in Suva, Fiji

Coordinates: 18.09042°S 178.44872°E

Mataika House (in Tamavua, Suva, Fiji) is the building that houses, and the informal name for, what is formally now called the Fiji Centre for Disease Control (Fiji CDC), and what used to be called the "Fiji Centre for Communicable Disease Control (FCCDC)" and before that the National Centre for Scientific Services for Virology and Vector Borne Diseases (NCSSVVBD), a subdivision of the Fiji Ministry of Health.

For the purposes of the World Health Organization's Global Influenza Programme (GISN), the FCCDC is the National Influenza Centre designated by the government of Fiji, having been designated as such in 2004.

Officially opened as the NCSSVVBD on 1999-12-02 by Dr Shigeru Omi, the WHO regional director for the Western Pacific, the Centre's name was changed to the FCCDC on 2005-02-09 and then Fiji CDC on March 11, 2020.
