= 1996 Fiji rugby union tour of Hong Kong =

Summary
P	W	D	L
Total
3	3	0	0
Test match
2	2	0	0
Opponent
P	W	D	L
Hong Kong
1	0	0	1

The 1996 Fiji rugby union tour of Hong Kong were a series of matches played in September and October in Hong Kong by the Fiji national rugby union team.

== Results ==
Scores and results list Fiji's points tally first.

Opposing Team	For	Against	Date	Venue	Status
Hong Kong	64	11	29 September 1996	Hong Kong	Test match
Hong Kong Dev. XV	92	3	1 October 1996	Hong Kong	Tour match
Hong Kong	37	16	5 October 1996	Hong Kong	Test match
