= SS Newnham =

First steamship to bring Indian indentured labourers to Fiji

History

United Kingdom
- Name: SS Newnham
- Owner: J. Temperley & Co
- Builder: Palmers' Co., Newcastle upon Tyne
- Launched: 10 September 1880
- Fate: Wrecked 19 December 1889

General characteristics
- Tonnage: 2,010 GRT
- Length: 285 ft (87 m)
- Beam: 35.3 ft (10.8 m)
- Installed power: 240
- Propulsion: compound engine with 2 inverted cylinders of 35 & 68 inches diameter respectively

Newnham was the first steamship to bring Indian indentured labourers to Fiji, arriving at Suva on 23 July 1884 carrying 575 passengers. The 1296 ton steamer took only 38 days to reach Fiji as it was able to take the shorter route through the Timor sea.

Although a lower death rate was expected because of the shorter trip and fewer cases of pneumonia and bronchitis because the ship avoided the cooler climate of the southerly route, the ship rolled violently during the trip and there were many deaths. The Fiji Government favoured sailing ships also because steam ships sailed through hot weather which could foster tropical diseases which could spread in Fiji and also because any diseases on board would have a chance to incubate during the longer trip.

Its trip to Fiji was part of a 33,000 mile tour which began on 20 February 1884 in New York under Captain James Johnston. She sailed to St John, New-Brunswick, loaded a cargo of lumber and on 4 March sailed for Liverpool, then to Cardiff on 29 March, where she loaded coal and departed for Colombo, Ceylon on 5 April, passing through the Straits of Gibraltar, Mediterranean Sea, Suez Canal, Red Sea and the Indian Ocean. From Colombo she proceeded to Calcutta to load coolies and left for Fiji in May. She arrived in Suva, via the Torres Straits, and on 21 July departed for Newcastle, New South Wales where she arrived on 12 August and left with a cargo of coal on 30 August, arriving in Singapore, via Torres Strait, on 21 September. On 8 October she was in Calcutta and left on 9 December with 500 coolies for Demerara (British Guinea) and cargo for New York. On this voyage she travelled 11,500 miles, stopping at Mauritius, Cape Town and St Helena before reaching Demerara (with only seven deaths on board). From there she went to New York.

The Colonial Sugar Refining Company favoured steam ships because their arrival dates could be estimated more accurately, and because they took less time to reach Fiji, the labourers would be fitter and would have time to become acclimatized before participating in the cane crushing season which started in May or June.

== See also ==
- Indian Indenture Ships to Fiji
- Indian indenture system
