= Mohammed Afzal Khan =

Fijian lawyer and politician

Mohammed Afzal Khan is a Fijian lawyer and political leader of Indian descent. He served in the Senate from 2002 to 2006 as one of eight nominees of the Leader of the Opposition. From 10 April 2004 to 20 March 2019, he was the honorary consul general of Bangladesh in Fiji.
