= Tui Delai Gau =

Mountain god in Fijian mythology

Tui Delai Gau is the god of mountains in Fijian mythology, who can remove his hands and have them fish for him. He can also take off his head and put it in the sky as a look-out. He lives in a tree.
