= Trials since the 2000 Fijian coup d'état =

A number of prominent participants in the 2000 Fijian coup d'état were tried, and some convicted, in 2004 and 2005.

== Sources ==
- Baba, T., Nabobo-Baba, U., Field, M. (2005). Speight of Violence: Inside Fiji's 2000 Coup. Australia: Pandanus Books., ISBN 9781740761703
- Pretes, M. (2008). Coup: Reflections on the Political Crisis in Fiji. United States: ANU E Press., ISBN 9781921536373
- Trnka, S. (2011). State of Suffering: Political Violence and Community Survival in Fiji. United States: Cornell University Press., ISBN 9780801461880
