= Kaivalagi =

Fijian word meaning someone "from the land of the foreigners"

Kaivalagi is a Fijian word meaning someone "from the land of the foreigners". Its antonym, kaiviti, means "someone from Fiji". It is often used instead of the word vulagi, meaning foreigner or stranger. In practice, kaivalagi usually means "white person" or "European" (which in Fiji English also includes white people from America and Australasia), whilst vulagi can include all non-Fijians.

Similar words for "white man" exist in most Melanesian, Polynesian and Micronesian languages: For example, in the Cook Islands - "Papa'a"; New Zealand - Pākehā; New Caledonian slang - "poken" (although this is used only for English speaking foreigners); Hawaii - "Haole"; Samoa - "Palagi"; Tonga - "Papalagi"; Marshall Islands - "ri-Likin" etc.

== See also ==
- Culture of Fiji
