= Mount Voma =

Mountain in Fiji

Coordinates: 17.993521°S 178.119657°E

- Location within Fiji

Highest point
- Elevation: 1,204 m (3,950 ft)

Geography
- Location: Viti Levu, Fiji

Mount Voma is the third highest mountain in Fiji. It is situated on the main island of Viti Levu and is part of the dividing range running from north to south of the island. Its height is 3,950 feet or 1204 meters.
