= Scouting and Guiding in Fiji =

The Scout and Guide movement in Fiji is served by

- Fiji Girl Guides Association, member of the World Association of Girl Guides and Girl Scouts
- Fiji Scouts Association, member of the World Organization of the Scout Movement
