= Raranitiqa =

Island in the Ringgold Isles, Fiji

Native name: Rara ni Tinka
- Location within Fiji

Geography
- Location: South Pacific Ocean
- Coordinates: 16.5440144°S 179.7024022°W
- Archipelago: Ringgold Isles
- Area: 0.249 km^{2} (0.096 sq mi)

Administration
- Fiji
- Division: Eastern Division
- Province: Cakaudrove
- Tikina: Wainikeli

Demographics
- Population: 0

Additional information
- Time zone: UTC GMT +12

Raranitiqa Island (also known as Rara ni Tinka or Tavuka) is a Fijian island located within the Ringgold Isles archipelago, which forms an outlier group to the northern island of Vanua Levu. It is located within the Budd Reef and large formations of rocks, known as the Gangway rocks, make navigation around the island dangerous at night. It has a land area of 2.49 hectares (6.2 acres; 24,900 m^{2}). The southern part of the island has a "well-defined summit."

== See also ==
- Desert island
- List of islands
