= Tulsi Ram Khelwan =

Fijian politician

Tulsi Ram Khelwan is an Indo-Fijian politician and former member of the Senate of Fiji. He served in the Senate from 2002 to 2006 as one of eight nominees of the Leader of the Opposition. As a Senator he advocated for reform of Fiji's sugar industry.

At the 2006 Fijian general election he objected to SDL candidate Jale Baba's nomination on the grounds of pending bankruptcy proceedings. He later acted as chair of the Fiji Labour Party's national council in its efforts to expel five senior dissident members in 2006.
