= Robert Shuster =

British judge

Robert Shuster is a British judge who has been a judge on the courts of Tonga, Fiji, and Sierra Leone. Shuster is best known for a 2010 sentence in which he ordered two teenage boys in Tonga to be whipped.

Shuster was appointed to the Supreme Court of Tonga in May 2008. In 2010, two 17-year-old Tongan boys were convicted in Shuster's court of theft and escape from prison. As punishment, Shuster sentenced them each to 13 years' imprisonment and to be whipped on the buttocks six times with a cat-o-nine-tails. The sentence was legal under Tongan law, but corporal punishment had not been used as a legal punishment since the 1980s. The sentence sparked concern in Tonga and internationally, and the flogging portion of Shuster's sentence was overturned on appeal to the Court of Appeal.

Shuster was the presiding judge at the Royal Commission of Enquiry into the sinking of the MV Princess Ashika. In May 2012, Shuster completed his second two-year term as a judge in Tonga and was replaced with New Zealander Charles Cato.
