= Sarojini Pillay =

Fijian academic of Indian descent

Sarojini Pillay is a Fijian academic of Indian descent. In the second week of February 2006, Pillay, a former Registrar of the University of the South Pacific (USP), was appointed as the first Registrar of the newly founded University of Fiji, scheduled to take up her duties on 13 March.

Pillay is a graduate of the Central Michigan University in the United States, the University of Madras in India, and the Fiji School of Agriculture. She first became Registrar of the USP in 1991, and after her retirement from this position she was approached by the new university to be its first Registrar.

== Sources ==
- Fiji Sun
