= Aisea Tuidraki =

Fijian cricketer (1916–1966)

Personal information
- Full name: Aisea Turuva Tuidraki

International information
- National side: Fiji

Career statistics
Competition	FC
Matches	2
Runs scored	53
Batting average	13.25
100s/50s	–/–
Top score	23
Balls bowled	–
Wickets	–
Bowling average	–
5 wickets in innings	–
10 wickets in match	–
Best bowling	–
Catches/stumpings	4/–
- Source: Cricinfo, 14 March 2010

Aisea Turuva Tuidraki (born 3 February 1916 at Saunaka, Nadi; died 1966 at Nukulau, Fiji) was a Fijian cricketer.

Tuidraki made his first-class debut for Fiji in 1948 against Wellington during Fiji's 1947/48 tour of New Zealand. He played one other first-class match during the tour against Auckland. In his two first-class matches for Fiji he scored 53 runs at a batting average of 13.25, with a high score of 23. In the field Tuidraki took four catches. He played six non-first-class matches for Fiji on their 1947/48 tour, with his final match coming against Bay of Plenty.

Tuidraki died in 1966 at Nukulau, Fiji.
