= List of endemic plants of Fiji =

Fiji is an archipelago and island nation in the South Pacific. It consists of two large islands, Vanua Levu and Viti Levu, and many smaller islands. The Fijian islands are home to dozens of endemic species and subspecies of vascular plants, including the endemic genera Degeneria, Gillespiea, and Hedstromia.

Plants are listed alphabetically by plant family. Extinct and presumed extinct species are indicated with †.

== Acanthaceae ==
- Graptophyllum repandum (A.Gray) A.C.Sm.
- Graptophyllum sessilifolium A.C.Sm. – Vanua Levu
- Pseuderanthemum laxiflorum (A.Gray) F.T.Hubb.

== Actinidiaceae ==
- Saurauia rubicunda (A.Gray) Seem.

== Anacardiaceae ==
- Pleiogynium hapalum A.C.Sm.

== Annonaceae ==
- Drepananthus vitiensis (A.C.Sm.) Survesw. & R.M.K.Saunders
- † Goniothalamus angustifolius (A.C.Sm.) B.Xue & R.M.K.Saunders – southern Viti Levu: Mt. Korobaba. Last recorded in 1927.
- Goniothalamus monospermus (A.Gray) R.M.K.Saunders
- Huberantha amoena (A.C.Sm.) Chaowasku – Vanua Levu
- Huberantha capillata (A.C.Sm.) Chaowasku – Viti Levu
- Huberantha loriformis (Gillespie) Chaowasku
- Huberantha vitiensis (Seem.) Chaowasku
- Meiogyne amygdalina (A.Gray) B.Xue & R.M.K.Saunders – Viti Levu, Ovalau
- Meiogyne habrotricha (A.C.Sm.) B.Xue & R.M.K.Saunders – Viti Levu
- Meiogyne insularis (A.C.Sm.) D.C.Thomas, B.Xue & R.M.K.Saunders – Viti Levu
- Meiogyne laddiana (A.C.Sm.) B.Xue & R.M.K.Saunders – southeastern Fiji
- Xylopia degeneri A.C.Sm. – Viti Levu
- Xylopia pacifica A.C.Sm.
- Xylopia vitiensis A.C.Sm.

== Apocynaceae ==
- Alyxia erythrosperma Gillespie – Viti Levu
- Carruthersia scandens (Seem.) Seem.
- Hoya desvoeuxensis T.Green & Kloppenb.
- Hoya megalantha Turrill
- Hoya smithii Kloppenb.
- Hoya vitiensis Turrill
  - Hoya vitiensis subsp. parksii Kloppenb. – Viti Levu
  - Hoya vitiensis subsp. vitiensis – Viti Levu and Vanua Levu
- Parsonsia smithii Markgr. – Vanua Levu
- Sarcolobus stenophyllus (A.Gray) P.I.Forst. – northern Vanua Levu and Yasawa Is.
- Sarcolobus venulosus (A.C.Sm.) P.I.Forst. – Viti Levu
- Tabernaemontana thurstonii Horne ex Baker

== Araliaceae ==
- Meryta tenuifolia A.C.Sm. – Viti Levu
- Plerandra bakeriana A.C.Sm. – Viti Levu
- Plerandra costata (A.C.Sm.) G.M.Plunkett, Lowry & Frodin
- Plerandra grandiflora A.C.Sm. – Vanua Levu
- Plerandra grayi Seem. – Viti Levu
- Plerandra insolita A.C.Sm. – Viti Levu
- Plerandra pickeringii A.Gray
- Plerandra seemanniana (A.C.Sm.) G.M.Plunkett, Lowry & Frodin – Viti Levu
- Plerandra victoriae Gibbs – Viti Levu and Vanua Levu
- Plerandra vitiensis (Seem.) Baill.
- Polyscias corticata Gibbs
- Polyscias culminicola A.C.Sm. – Viti Levu
- Polyscias joskei Gibbs
- Schefflera euthytricha A.C.Sm.
- Schefflera vitiensis (A.Gray) Seem.

== Arecaceae ==
- Balaka diffusa Hodel – Viti Levu
- Balaka longirostris Becc. – Viti Levu
- Balaka macrocarpa Burret – southern Viti Levu and Vanua Levu
- Balaka microcarpa Burret – southeastern Viti Levu
- Balaka pauciflora (H.Wendl.) H.E.Moore – Ovalau
- Balaka seemannii (H.Wendl.) Becc. – Vanua Levu and Taveuni
- Balaka streptostachys D.Fuller & Dowe – Vanua Levu: Mt. Sorolevu
- Clinostigma exorrhizum (H.Wendl.) Becc.
- Cyphosperma naboutinense Hodel & Marcus – Viti Levu
- Cyphosperma tanga (H.E.Moore) H.E.Moore – Viti Levu: Mt. Tomanivi
- Cyphosperma trichospadix (Burret) H.E.Moore – Vanua Levu and Taveuni
- Heterospathe longipes (H.E.Moore) Norup
- Heterospathe phillipsii D.Fuller & Dowe – southern Viti Levu
- Hydriastele boumae W.J.Baker & D.Watling – Taveuni
- Hydriastele vitiensis W.J.Baker & Loo
- Neoveitchia storckii (H.Wendl.) Becc. – southeastern Viti Levu
- Physokentia petiolata (Burret) D.Fuller – Viti Levu and Gau
- Physokentia thurstonii (Becc.) Becc. – Vanua Levu and Taveuni
- Veitchia filifera (H.Wendl.) H.E.Moore – Vanua Levu and southern Taveuni
- Veitchia joannis H.Wendl
- Veitchia simulans H.E.Moore – Taveuni
- Veitchia vitiensis (H.Wendl.) H.E.Moore

== Aspleniaceae ==
- Asplenium stenolobum C.Chr. – Viti Levu
- Blechnum brackenridgei (Carruth.) Perrie & Brownsey – Viti Levu and Ovalau
- Blechnum difforme Copel. – Viti Levu
- Coryphopteris vitiensis Holttum – Viti Levu
- Deparia gordonii (Baker) M.Kato – Viti Levu
- Diplazium gillespiei (Copel.) M.Kato – Viti Levu
- Diplazium melanocaulon var. coriaceum (Carruth.) Brownlie
- Phegopteris fijiensis (K.U.Kramer & E.Zogg) Christenh.
- Thelypteris archboldiae (Copel.) C.F.Reed – Viti Levu and Vanua Levu

== Asteraceae ==
- Adenostemma vitiense H.Rob.
- Pytinicarpa pickeringii (A.Gray) G.L.Nesom
- Strobocalyx insularum (A.Gray) Sch.Bip.

== Burseraceae ==
- Canarium harveyi var. scandens Leenh. – southern Viti Levu

== Calophyllaceae ==
- Calophyllum amblyphyllum A.C.Sm. & S.P.Darwin – southern Viti Levu
- Calophyllum leptocladum A.C.Sm. & S.P.Darwin
- Calophyllum leucocarpum A.C.Sm. – Vanua Levu

== Cannabaceae ==
- Celtis vitiensis A.C.Sm. – northern and western Viti Levu

== Cardiopteridaceae ==
- Citronella vitiensis R.A.Howard

== Casuarinaceae ==
- Gymnostoma vitiense L.A.S.Johnson

== Celastraceae ==
- Celastrus richii A.Gray
- Elaeodendron vitiense A.C.Sm. – Viti Levu and Ovalau
- Salacia vitiensis A.C.Sm.

== Chrysobalanaceae ==
- Atuna elliptica (Kosterm.) Kosterm. – Viti Levu

== Clusiaceae ==
- Garcinia adinantha A.C.Sm. & S.P.Darwin

== Combretaceae ==
- Terminalia capitanea A.C.Sm. – southeastern Viti Levu
- Terminalia crebrifolia A.C.Sm. – west-central Vanua Levu
- Terminalia luteola A.C.Sm. – Vanua Levu
- Terminalia psilantha A.C.Sm. – Vanua Levu
- Terminalia pterocarpa Melville & P.S.Green – southeastern Viti Levu
- Terminalia simulans A.C.Sm. – Vanua Levu
- Terminalia strigillosa A.C.Sm. – north-central Vanua Levu
- Terminalia vitiensis A.C.Sm. – south-central Viti Levu

== Convolvulaceae ==
- Decalobanthus calyculatus (Ooststr.) A.R.Simões & Chatrou

== Cunoniaceae ==
- Geissois imthurnii Turrill – Viti Levu
- Geissois stipularis A.C.Sm. – Viti Levu
- Geissois superba Gillespie – Viti Levu
- Geissois ternata A.Gray
  - Geissois ternata var. glabrior A.C.Sm.
  - Geissois ternata var. minor A.C.Sm.
  - Geissois ternata var. serrata A.C.Sm. – Waya
  - Geissois ternata var. ternata
- Pterophylla exigua (A.C.Sm.) Pillon & H.C.Hopkins – Vanua Levu
- Pterophylla richii (A.Gray) Pillon & H.C.Hopkins
- Pterophylla vitiensis (Seem.) Pillon & H.C.Hopkins
- Spiraeanthemum graeffei Seem. – Viti Levu
- Spiraeanthemum katakata Seem.
- Spiraeanthemum serratum Gillespie – Viti Levu and Taveuni
- Spiraeanthemum vitiense A.Gray

== Cyatheaceae ==
- Sphaeropteris microlepidota (Copel.) R.M.Tryon – Viti Levu and Vanua Levu

== Cyperaceae ==
- Carex albert-smithii T.Koyama
- Carex gibbsiae Rendle

== Degeneriaceae ==
- Degeneria I.W.Bailey & A.C.Sm.
  - Degeneria roseiflora John M.Mill. – Vanua Levu and Taveuni
  - Degeneria vitiensis I.W.Bailey & A.C.Sm. – Viti Levu

== Dennstaedtiaceae ==
- Dennstaedtia inermis (Baker) Brownlie – Viti Levu
- Microlepia vitiensis Brownlie – Viti Levu and Vanua Levu

== Ebenaceae ==
- Diospyros gillespiei (Fosberg) Kosterm.
  - Diospyros gillespiei var. gillespiei
  - Diospyros gillespiei var. nandarivatensis (Gillespie) A.C.Sm. – northern Viti Levu
- Diospyros phlebodes (A.C.Sm.) A.C.Sm.
- Diospyros vitiensis Gillespie
  - Diospyros vitiensis var. longisepala (Gillespie) A.C.Sm.
  - Diospyros vitiensis var. vitiensis

== Elaeocarpaceae ==
- Elaeocarpus ampliflorus A.C.Sm. – Viti Levu
- Elaeocarpus cassinoides A.Gray
- Elaeocarpus chelonimorphus Gillespie
- Elaeocarpus chionanthus A.C.Sm. – Viti Levu
- Elaeocarpus degenerianus A.C.Sm. – Viti Levu
- Elaeocarpus gillespieanus A.C.Sm. – Vanua Levu
- Elaeocarpus kambi Gibbs – Viti Levu
- Elaeocarpus kasiensis A.C.Sm. – Viti Levu
- Elaeocarpus laurifolius A.Gray – Vanua Levu
- Elaeocarpus lepidus A.C.Sm.
- Elaeocarpus melochioides A.C.Sm. – Viti Levu
- Elaeocarpus milnei Seem. – Viti Levu
- Elaeocarpus pittosporoides A.C.Sm. – Viti Levu
- Elaeocarpus praeclarus A.C.Sm. – Vanua Levu
- Elaeocarpus pyriformis A.Gray
- Elaeocarpus roseiflorus A.C.Sm. – Vanua Levu
- Elaeocarpus storckii Seem.
- Elaeocarpus subcapitatus Gillespie – Viti Levu
- Elaeocarpus vitiensis Gillespie – Viti Levu
- Elaeocarpus xanthodactylus A.C.Sm. – Vanua Levu and Moala

== Ericaceae ==
- Paphia vitiensis Seem. – Viti Levu

== Euphorbiaceae ==
- Acalypha amplexicaulis A.C.Sm. – northern and western Viti Levu
- Acalypha insulana var. anisodonta (Müll.Arg.) Govaerts
- Acalypha insulana var. flavicans Müll.Arg.
- Acalypha repanda var. denudata (Müll.Arg.) A.C.Sm.
- Acalypha rivularis Seem.
- Claoxylon echinospermum Müll.Arg.
- Claoxylon vitiense Gillespie
- Cleidion leptostachyum (Müll.Arg.) Pax & K.Hoffm.
- Croton heterotrichus Müll.Arg. – Viti Levu
- Croton leptopus Müll.Arg.
- Croton metallicus Müll.Arg.
- Endospermum macrophyllum (Müll.Arg.) Pax & K.Hoffm.
- Endospermum robbieanum A.C.Sm. – central and southern Vanua Levu
- Excoecaria acuminata Gillespie
- Excoecaria confertiflora A.C.Sm. – southern Viti Levu
- Macaranga caesariata A.C.Sm. – Viti Levu
- Macaranga graeffeana Pax & K.Hoffm.
  - Macaranga graeffeana var. crenata (A.C.Sm.) A.C.Sm.
  - Macaranga graeffeana var. graeffeana
  - Macaranga graeffeana var. major A.C.Sm.
- Macaranga magna Turrill – Viti Levu
- Macaranga marikoensis A.C.Sm.
- Macaranga membranacea Müll.Arg. – northern and western Vanua Levu
- Macaranga secunda Müll.Arg.
- Macaranga seemannii var. deltoides A.C.Sm. – western Viti Levu
- Macaranga vitiensis Pax & K.Hoffm.

== Fabaceae ==
- Acacia mathuataensis A.C.Sm. – Viti Levu
- Acacia richii A.Gray
- Canavalia vitiensis J.D.Sauer
- Cynometra falcata A.Gray – Viti Levu and Vanua Levu
- Cynometra insularis A.C.Sm.
- Cynometra minor (A.C.Sm.) Rados.
- Cynometra vestita (A.C.Sm.) Rados. – Viti Levu and Vanua Levu
- Cynometra vitiensis Rados.
- Parkia parrii Horne ex Baker – Vanua Levu
- Prioria platycarpa (B.L.Burtt) Breteler
- Serianthes melanesica var. meeboldii Fosberg
- Serianthes vitiensis A.Gray – Vanua Levu
- Storckiella vitiensis Seem.

== Flagellariaceae ==
- Flagellaria collaris Wepfer & H.P.Linder

== Gentianaceae ==
- Fagraea gracilipes A.Gray

== Gesneriaceae ==
- Cyrtandra acutangula Seem. – south-central Viti Levu
- Cyrtandra aloisiana A.C.Sm. – southern Viti Levu
- Cyrtandra amicta A.C.Sm. – Viti Levu
- Cyrtandra anthropophagorum Seem. ex A.Gray
- Cyrtandra cephalophora Gillespie
- Cyrtandra chippendalei Horne ex C.B.Clarke
- Cyrtandra chlorantha A.C.Sm. – Viti Levu
- Cyrtandra ciliata Seem.
- Cyrtandra coleoides Seem.
- Cyrtandra cyathibracteata G.W.Gillett – Viti Levu
- Cyrtandra denhamii Seem. – Ngau
- Cyrtandra dolichocarpa A.Gray
- Cyrtandra esothrix A.C.Sm. – Viti Levu
- Cyrtandra gregoryi M.A.Johnson – Taveuni
- Cyrtandra harveyi Seem. – Vanua Levu
- Cyrtandra hispida M.A.Johnson – Taveuni
- Cyrtandra hornei C.B.Clarke – Viti Levu
- Cyrtandra involucrata Seem.
- Cyrtandra jugalis A.C.Sm. – Viti Levu
- Cyrtandra kandavuensis A.C.Sm. – Kandavu
- Cyrtandra leucantha A.C.Sm.
- Cyrtandra longifruticosa M.A.Johnson – Vanua Levu
- Cyrtandra milnei Seem.
- Cyrtandra montana Gillespie – Viti Levu
- Cyrtandra multiseptata Gillespie – Viti Levu
- Cyrtandra muskarimba A.C.Sm.
- Cyrtandra natewaensis G.W.Gillett
- Cyrtandra occulta A.C.Sm. – north-central Viti Levu
- Cyrtandra prattii Gillespie – Viti Levu
- Cyrtandra pritchardii Seem.
- Cyrtandra reticulata G.W.Gillett – Vanua Levu
- Cyrtandra rotumaensis H.St.John – Rotuma
- Cyrtandra spathacea A.C.Sm. – Viti Levu
- Cyrtandra taviunensis Gillespie – Taveuni
- Cyrtandra tempestii Horne ex C.B.Clarke – southeastern Taveuni
- Cyrtandra tomentosa A.C.Sm. – Viti Levu
- Cyrtandra trichophylla A.C.Sm. – Viti Levu
- Cyrtandra tuiwawae M.A.Johnson – Taveuni
- Cyrtandra ventricosa G.W.Gillett
- Cyrtandra victoriae Gillespie – Viti Levu
- Cyrtandra vitiensis Seem. – Viti Levu
- Cyrtandra waisaliensis M.A.Johnson – Vanua Levu
- Cyrtandra xanthantha A.C.Sm. – Viti Levu

== Heliconiaceae ==
- Heliconia paka A.C.Sm.

== Hernandiaceae ==
- Hernandia olivacea Gillespie

== Hymenophyllaceae ==
- Trichomanes caespifrons C.Chr.

== Lamiaceae ==
- Gmelina vitiensis (Seem.) A.C.Sm.
- Oxera lehuntei (Horne ex Baker) Gâteblé & Barrabé – Viti Levu
- Premna protrusa A.C.Sm. & S.P.Darwin
- Vitex vitilevuensis (Munir) Bramley – Viti Levu

== Lauraceae ==
- Cinnamomum degeneri C.K.Allen – Viti Levu and Ovalau
- Cinnamomum fitianum (Meisn.) A.C.Sm.
- Cinnamomum lanuginosum Kosterm.
- Cinnamomum ovalauense Kosterm.
- Cinnamomum pallidum Gillespie
- Cinnamomum rigidum Gillespie – Viti Levu
- Cinnamomum vitiense Kosterm. – Viti Levu
- Cryptocarya barbellata A.C.Sm. – Viti Levu
- Cryptocarya constricta C.K.Allen
- Cryptocarya fusca Gillespie
- Cryptocarya lancifolia A.C.Sm.
- Cryptocarya parinarioides A.C.Sm. – northern and western Viti Levu
- Cryptocarya turrilliana A.C.Sm.
- Endiandra gillespiei A.C.Sm.
- Endiandra luteola A.C.Sm.
- Endiandra monticola A.C.Sm.
- Endiandra reticulata Gillespie – Viti Levu
- Endiandra trichotosa A.C.Sm.
- Endiandra tryphera A.C.Sm.
- Litsea alleniana A.C.Sm. – Viti Levu
- Litsea burckelloides A.C.Sm. – Viti Levu
- Litsea grayana A.C.Sm.
- Litsea hornei A.C.Sm. – Viti Levu
- Litsea imthurnii Turrill – Viti Levu
- Litsea mathuataensis A.C.Sm. – Vanua Levu
- Litsea palmatinervia (Meisn.) Benth. & Hook.f. ex Drake – south-central Viti Levu
- Litsea pickeringii (A.Gray ex Seem.) Benth. & Hook.f. ex Drake
- Litsea richii A.C.Sm.
- Litsea seemannii (Meisn.) Benth. & Hook.f. ex Drake – Viti Levu and Ovalau
- Litsea vitiana (Meisn.) Benth. & Hook.f. ex Drake

== Lecythidaceae ==
- Barringtonia seaturae H.B.Guppy – Viti Levu and Vanua Levu

== Linaceae ==
- Hugonia vitiensis (Stapf) Byng & Christenh. – southern and southeastern Viti Levu

== Lindsaeaceae ==
- Lindsaea lapeyrousei subsp. fijiensis – Viti Levu and Vanua Levu
- Lindsaea vitiensis K.U.Kramer

== Loganiaceae ==
- Geniostoma calcicola A.C.Sm. – Fulanga
- Geniostoma macrophyllum Gillespie
- Geniostoma stipulare A.C.Sm. & B.C.Stone
- Neuburgia alata (A.C.Sm.) A.C.Sm. – southeasdtern Viti Levu
- Neuburgia collina (A.C.Sm.) A.C.Sm. – Viti Levu and Vanua Levu
- Neuburgia macrocarpa (A.C.Sm.) A.C.Sm. – Viti Levu and Vanua Levu
- Neuburgia macroloba (A.C.Sm.) A.C.Sm. – Taveuni

== Lycopodiaceae ==
- Huperzia foliosa (Copel.) Holub
- Huperzia trifoliata (Copel.) Holub

== Malpighiaceae ==
- Hiptage myrtifolia A.Gray

== Malvaceae ==
- Firmiana diversifolia A.Gray
- Grewia vitiensis Turrill – western Viti Levu
- Hibiscus bennettii L.A.J.Thomson & Braglia – Vanua Levu
- Hibiscus bragliae L.A.J.Thomson – Ovalau
- Hibiscus fijiensis F.D.Wilson – Vanua Levu
- Hibiscus macverryi L.A.J.Thomson & Braglia – Taveuni
- Hibiscus storckii Seem. – Taveuni
- Melochia degeneriana A.C.Sm.
- Melochia grayana A.C.Sm. – Vanua Levu
- Melochia longepetiolata A.C.Sm. – Kandavu
- Melochia mollipila A.C.Sm. – northwestern Viti Levu
- Melochia parhamii A.C.Sm. – Vanua Levu
- Melochia roseiflora A.C.Sm. – northwestern Viti Levu
- Microcos vitiensis A.C.Sm. – Viti Levu and Taveuni
- Pterocymbium oceanicum A.C.Sm. – northwestern Viti Levu and east-central Vanua Levu
- Sterculia dasyphylla A.C.Sm. – Vanua Levu
- Sterculia vitiensis Seem. – Viti Levu and Vanua Levu
- Trichospermum fosbergii Kosterm. – Vanua Levu
- Trichospermum smithii Kosterm. – Vanua Levu

== Melastomataceae ==
- Astronidium angulosum J.F.Maxwell
- Astronidium confertiflorum (A.Gray) Markgr.
- Astronidium degeneri A.C.Sm.
- † Astronidium floribundum (Gillespie) A.C.Sm. – Viti Levu: southeastern Mt. Korombamba. Last recorded in 1927.
- Astronidium inflatum (A.C.Sm.) A.C.Sm.
- † Astronidium kasiense A.C.Sm. – Vanua Levu: Mt. Kasi. Last recorded in 1934.
- Astronidium lepidotum A.C.Sm.
- Astronidium macranthum (A.C.Sm.) A.C.Sm.
- Astronidium pallidiflorum A.C.Sm.
- Astronidium parviflorum A.Gray
- Astronidium pseudoparviflorum J.F.Maxwell
- Astronidium robustum (Seem.) A.C.Sm.
- Astronidium saulae A.C.Sm.
- Astronidium sessile (A.C.Sm.) A.C.Sm.
- Astronidium storckii Seem.
- Astronidium tomentosum (Seem.) A.C.Sm.
- Astronidium victoriae (Gillespie) A.C.Sm.
- Medinilla archboldiana A.C.Sm.
- Medinilla decora A.C.Sm.
- Medinilla heterophylla A.Gray
- Medinilla kambikambi A.C.Sm.
- † Medinilla kandavuensis A.C.Sm. – Kadavu: Hills above Namalata and Ngaloa Bays. Last recorded in 1933.
- Medinilla longicymosa Gibbs
- Medinilla ovalifolia (A.Gray) A.C.Sm.
- Medinilla rhodochlaena A.Gray
- Medinilla spectabilis A.C.Sm.
- Medinilla subviridis A.C.Sm.
- Medinilla waterhousei Seem. – Taveuni and Vanua Levu
- Memecylon insperatum A.C.Sm.

== Meliaceae ==
- Aglaia amplexicaulis A.C.Sm. – western Viti Levu
- Aglaia archboldiana A.C.Sm. – Viti Levu and Ovalau
- Aglaia basiphylla A.Gray
- Aglaia evansensis A.C.Sm. – northwestern Viti Levu
- Aglaia fragilis A.C.Sm. – northern and west-central Viti Levu
- Aglaia gracilis A.C.Sm. – Viti Levu
- Aglaia unifolia P.T.Li & X.M.Chen – Viti Levu
- Aglaia vitiensis A.C.Sm.
- Didymocheton aliquantulus (A.C.Sm.) Holzmeyer & Hauenschild – northwestern Viti Levu
- Didymocheton hornei (Gillespie) Harms
  - Didymocheton hornei var. glabratus (A.C.Sm.) Holzmeyer & Hauenschild
  - Didymocheton hornei var. hornei
- Didymocheton lenticellaris (Gillespie) Harms
- Didymocheton multijugus (Seem.) Harms
- Didymocheton myriandrus (A.C.Sm.) Holzmeyer & Hauenschild
- Didymocheton tenuiflorus (A.C.Sm.) Holzmeyer & Hauenschild
- Epicharis gillespieana (A.C.Sm.) Holzmeyer & Hauenschild
- Vavaea degeneri A.C.Sm. – Viti Levu and southern Vanua Levu
- Vavaea megaphylla C.H.Wright

== Moraceae ==
- Ficus bambusifolia Seem.
- Ficus barclayana (Miq.) Miq.
- Ficus fulvopilosa Summerh.
- Ficus greenwoodii Summerh.
- Ficus masonii Horne ex Baker
- Ficus pritchardii Seem.
- Ficus vitiensis Seem.

== Myristicaceae ==
- Myristica acsmithii W.J.de Wilde
- Myristica chartacea Gillespie
- Myristica gillespieana A.C.Sm.
- Myristica grandifolia A.DC.
- Myristica macrantha A.C.Sm.

== Myrtaceae ==
- Decaspermum cryptanthum A.J.Scott – Vanua Levu
- Decaspermum vitiense (A.Gray) Nied.
- Metrosideros ochrantha A.C.Sm. – Vanua Levu: Mt. Kasi
- Syzygium amicorum (A.Gray) Müll.Berol.
- Syzygium amplifolium L.M.Perry – southern Viti Levu
- Syzygium concinnum (A.C.Sm.) Craven & Biffin – Viti Levu
- Syzygium confertiflorum (A.Gray) Müll.Berol.
- Syzygium decussatum (A.C.Sm.) Biffin & Craven – Vanua Levu and Viti Levu
- Syzygium diffusum (Turrill) Merr. & L.M.Perry
- Syzygium dubium (L.M.Perry) A.C.Sm. – Vanua Levu
- Syzygium eugenioides (F.Muell.) Biffin & Craven
- Syzygium fijiense L.M.Perry
- Syzygium gillespiei Merr. & L.M.Perry
- Syzygium grayi (Seem.) Merr. & L.M.Perry
- Syzygium leucanthum L.M.Perry
- Syzygium minus A.C.Sm. – Viti Levu
- Syzygium myrtoides (A.Gray) R.Schmid – Viti Levu
- Syzygium nandarivatense (Gillespie) L.M.Perry – Viti Levu
- Syzygium oblongifolium (Gillespie) Merr. & L.M.Perry – Viti Levu
- Syzygium phaeophyllum Merr. & L.M.Perry – Taveuni
- Syzygium purpureum (L.M.Perry) A.C.Sm.
- Syzygium rubescens (A.Gray) Müll.Berol.
- Syzygium seemannianum Merr. & L.M.Perry
- Syzygium simillimum Merr. & L.M.Perry
- Syzygium tetrapleurum L.M.Perry – Viti Levu
- Syzygium wolfii (Gillespie) Merr. & L.M.Perry

== Ochnaceae ==
- Brackenridgea nitida subsp. nitida

== Oleaceae ==
- Jasminum degeneri Kobuski – northern Viti Levu and Yasawas
- Jasminum sessile A.C.Sm. – Vanua Levu
- Jasminum tetraquetrum A.Gray – Vanua Levu

== Orchidaceae ==
- Aglossorrhyncha bilobula Kores – Viti Levu
- Agrostophyllum aristatum Kores
- Bogoria godeffroyana (Rchb.f.) R.Rice
- Bulbophyllum amplistigmaticum Kores – Viti Levu
- Bulbophyllum aristopetalum Kores – Viti Levu
- Bulbophyllum incommodum Kores – Viti Levu
- Bulbophyllum phillipsianum Kores
- Bulbophyllum quadricarinum Kores – north-central Viti Levu
- Bulbophyllum simmondsii Kores
- Calanthe imthurnii Kores – Viti Levu
- Crepidium comans (C.Schweinf.) M.A.Clem. & D.L.Jones – Vanua Levu
- Crepidium imthurnii (Rolfe) M.A.Clem. & D.L.Jones
- Crepidium latisepalum (Rolfe) M.A.Clem. & D.L.Jones
- Crepidium longifolium (Rolfe) M.A.Clem. & D.L.Jones
- Crepidium platychilum (Rchb.f.) M.A.Clem. & D.L.Jones
- Crepidium schlechteri (Rolfe) M.A.Clem. & D.L.Jones
- Crepidium vitiense (Rolfe) M.A.Clem. & D.L.Jones
- Dendrobium carnicarinum Kores – Viti Levu
- Dendrobium hornei S.Moore – Rambi
- Dendrobium kraenzlinii L.O.Williams
- Dendrobium prasinum Lindl.
- Dendrobium spathulatum L.O.Williams – southeastern Viti Levu
- Dendrobium taveuniense Dauncey & P.J.Cribb
- Dendrobium tipuliferum Rchb.f.
- Dendrobium trilobulatum Kores
- Dendrobium vitiense Rolfe – Viti Levu
- Glomera emarginata Kores
- Goodyera vitiensis (L.O.Williams) Kores – Viti Levu and Vanua Levu
- Grammatophyllum elegans Rchb.f. – Viti Levu
- Habenaria superflua Rchb.f.
- Habenaria supervacanea Rchb.f. – Viti Levu
- Odontochilus degeneri L.O.Williams – northern Viti Levu
- Peristylus aliformis (C.Schweinf.) Renz & Vodonaivalu
- Phreatia bigibbula Kores
- Phreatia flavovirens Kores – Vanua Levu
- Phreatia gillespiei Kores – Viti Levu
- Phreatia oreophylax Rchb.f. – northern Vanua Levu
- Phreatia pentagona Kores
- Porpax bulbophylloides (C.Schweinf.) Schuit., Y.P.Ng & H.A.Pedersen
- Pseuderia platyphylla L.O.Williams
- Pseuderia smithiana C.Schweinf.
- Pseudovanilla anomala (Ames & L.O.Williams) Garay – southern Viti Levu
- Saccolabiopsis gillespiei (L.O.Williams) Garay – south-central Viti Levu
- Spathoglottis smithii Kores – Vanua Levu
- Taeniophyllum acsmithii Kocyan & Schuit. – Viti Levu
- Taeniophyllum confusum Kores & L.Jonss. – north-central Vanua Levu
- Taeniophyllum gracile (Rolfe) Garay
- Taeniophyllum smithii Kores & L.Jonss.
- Thrixspermum williamsianum (Kores) Ormerod

== Pandanaceae ==
- Benstonea thurstonii (C.H.Wright) Callm. & Buerki – southeastern Viti Levu, Koro, and Vanua Levu
- Freycinetia caudata Hemsl.
- Freycinetia grayana L.M.Perry – Vanua Levu
- Freycinetia vitiensis Seem.
- Pandanus alveatus H.St.John – Lau Group
- Pandanus basalticola H.St.John – Rotuma
- Pandanus brachus H.St.John – Rotuma
- Pandanus gillespiei H.St.John – Viti Levu
- Pandanus hata H.St.John – Rotuma
- Pandanus joskei Horne ex Balf.f. – Viti Levu and Koro
- Pandanus levuensis Martelli – Viti Levu
- Pandanus moalaensis H.St.John – Lau Group
- Pandanus rotumaensis H.St.John – Rotuma
- Pandanus rubricinctus H.St.John – Rotuma
- Pandanus sinicola A.C.Sm. – Vanua Mbalavu
- Pandanus taveuniensis H.St.John – western Taveuni
- Pandanus vitiensis Martelli – Viti Levu
- Pandanus yasawaensis H.St.John – Viti Levu and Waya

== Pentaphylacaceae ==
- Eurya greenwoodii Kobuski – northwestern and northern Viti Levu

== Phyllanthaceae ==
- Antidesma elassophyllum A.C.Sm. – Viti Levu and Vanua Levu
- Antidesma gillespieanum A.C.Sm.
- Antidesma insulare Gillespie – southeastern Viti Levu
- Antidesma pacificum Müll.Arg. – Vanua Levu and Moala
- Antidesma trichophyllum A.C.Sm. – Viti Levu
- Cleistanthus micranthus Croizat – Viti Levu and Vanua Levu
- Glochidion podocarpum (Müll.Arg.) C.B.Rob.
- Glochidion seemannii Müll.Arg.
- Glochidion vitiense (Müll.Arg.) Gillespie
- Nothobaccaurea pulvinata (A.C.Sm.) Haegens – Viti Levu
- Phyllanthus amentuliger Müll.Arg. – eastern Viti Levu and Vanua Levu
- Phyllanthus anfractuosus (Gibbs) W.L.Wagner & Lorence – Viti Levu and Ovalau
- Phyllanthus atalotrichus (A.C.Sm.) W.L.Wagner & Lorence – Viti Levu
- Phyllanthus atrovirens (A.C.Sm.) W.L.Wagner & Lorence – southern Viti Levu
- Phyllanthus bracteatus (Gillespie) W.L.Wagner & Lorence – Viti Levu
- Phyllanthus brunnescens (A.C.Sm.) W.L.Wagner & Lorence
- Phyllanthus calciphilus (Croizat) W.L.Wagner & Lorence – Fulanga and Kambara
- Phyllanthus cordatus (Seem. ex Müll.Arg.) Müll.Arg.
- Phyllanthus euryoides (A.C.Sm.) W.L.Wagner & Lorence – Viti Levu: Mt. Koromba
- Phyllanthus gillespiei (Croizat) W.L.Wagner & Lorence – Viti Levu
- Phyllanthus heterodoxus Müll.Arg. – Vanua Levu and Fulanga
- Phyllanthus inusitatus (A.C.Sm.) W.L.Wagner & Lorence – Vanua Levu: Mt. Ndelanathau
- Phyllanthus melvilleorum (Airy Shaw) W.L.Wagner & Lorence – Viti Levu
- Phyllanthus multilobus (A.C.Sm.) W.L.Wagner & Lorence – Vanua Levu
- Phyllanthus pergracilis Gillespie – Viti Levu
- Phyllanthus smithianus G.L.Webster
- Phyllanthus vitilevuensis W.L.Wagner & Lorence – Viti Levu
- Phyllanthus wilkesianus Müll.Arg. – Viti Levu and Vanua Levu

== Picrodendraceae ==
- Austrobuxus horneanus (A.C.Sm.) Airy Shaw – central Vanua Levu

== Piperaceae ==
- Peperomia albertiana Yunck. – Vanua Levu
- Peperomia attenuata Yunck. – Vanua Levu and Koro
  - Peperomia attenuata var. attenuata – Vanua Levu and Koro
  - Peperomia attenuata var. roseispica Yunck. – Vanua Levu
  - Peperomia attenuata var. taveuniana Yunck. – Taveuni
- Peperomia ciliifolia Yunck. – Vanua Levu
- Peperomia curtispica C.DC. – Viti Levu and Ovalau
- Peperomia disticha Yunck. – Viti Levu and Ovalau
- Peperomia falcata Yunck. – Taveuni
- Peperomia flavida C.DC. – Viti Levu
  - Peperomia flavida var. flavida – Viti Levu
  - Peperomia flavida var. pubinervis Yunck. – Vanua Levu
- Peperomia laevilimba Yunck. – Taveuni
- Peperomia lasiostigma C.DC.
  - Peperomia lasiostigma var. carnosa (C.DC.) Yunck
  - Peperomia lasiostigma var. lasiostigma
  - Peperomia lasiostigma var. microlimba Yunck. – northern Vanua Levu
- Peperomia naitasiriensis Yunck. – Viti Levu
- Peperomia namosiana Yunck. – Viti Levu
- Peperomia nandalana Yunck. – Viti Levu
  - Peperomia nandalana var. nandalana – Viti Levu
  - Peperomia nandalana var. nudipeduncula Yunck. – Vanua Levu
- Peperomia nandarivatensis Yunck. – Viti Levu
- Peperomia nodosa Yunck. – Viti Levu
- Peperomia orbiculimba Yunck. – Viti Levu and Ovalau
  - Peperomia orbiculimba var. mathuataensis Yunck. – Vanua Levu
  - Peperomia orbiculimba var. orbiculimba – Viti Levu and Ovalau
- Peperomia parhamii Yunck. – Viti Levu
- Peperomia pilostigma Yunck. – northern Lau Group
- Peperomia purpurinodis Yunck. – Viti Levu
- Peperomia rotumaensis H.St.John – Rotuma Is.
- Peperomia subroseispica C.DC. – Viti Levu and Kandavu
- Peperomia vitiana C.DC.
- Peperomia vitilevuensis Yunck. – Viti Levu
- Piper crispatum A.C.Sm. – Viti Levu
- Piper degeneri A.C.Sm. – Vanua Levu
- Piper kandavuense A.C.Sm. – Kandavu
- Piper oxycarpum C.DC. – Viti Levu
- Piper stipulare A.C.Sm.
- Piper vitiense A.C.Sm.

== Pittosporaceae ==
- Pittosporum oligodontum Gillespie – Viti Levu
- Pittosporum pickeringii A.Gray
- Pittosporum rhytidocarpum A.Gray

== Poaceae ==
- Garnotia divergens Swallen – Vanua Levu
- Garnotia foliosa Swallen – Vanua Levu
- Garnotia gracilis Swallen – Viti Levu
- Garnotia linearis Swallen
- Garnotia villosa Swallen – Viti Levu

== Podocarpaceae ==
- Acmopyle sahniana Buchholz & N.E.Gray – Viti Levu
- Dacrydium nausoriense de Laub. – western Viti Levu
- Podocarpus affinis Seem. – Viti Levu
- Podocarpus decipiens N.E.Gray – Viti Levu
- Podocarpus degeneri (N.E.Gray) de Laub. – Viti Levu and Vanua Levu

== Polypodiaceae ==
- Bolbitis vanuaensis Brownlie – Vanua Levu
- Ctenitis fijiensis (Hook.) Copel.
- Elaphoglossum basitruncatum Brownlie
- Elaphoglossum dominii Krajina – Ovalau
- Elaphoglossum imthurnii Krajina – Viti Levu
- Elaphoglossum milnei Krajina – Viti Levu
- Elaphoglossum ovalauense Krajina – Ovalau
- Grammitis alta Parris – Viti Levu
- Grammitis glabrata Brownlie – Vanua Levu
- Grammitis immersa (Brownlie) Christenh. – Taveuni
- Grammitis pubipes (Copel.) Christenh. – Viti Levu
- Grammitis vodonaivalui (Brownlie) Christenh. – Viti Levu
- Nephrolepis cordifolia var. pseudolauterbachii Hovenkamp & Miyam.
- Phymatosorus alatus (Brack.) Bosman
- Phymatosorus parksii (Copel.) Brownlie – Viti Levu and Taveuni
- Pleocnemia elegans (Copel.) Holttum – Vanua Levu and Viti Levu
- Polydictyum juglandifolium (Baker) Li Bing Zhang & Liang Zhang – Vanua Levu
- Polystichum pilosum Copel. – Viti Levu and Vanua Levu
- Tectaria godeffroyi (Luerss.) Copel. – Viti Levu
- Tectaria nausoriensis Brownlie – Viti Levu
- Tectaria tripartita (Baker) Copel. – Vanua Levu
- Tectaria vitiensis Brownlie – Viti Levu

== Primulaceae ==
- Discocalyx amplifolia A.C.Sm. – southeastern Viti Levu and Vanua Levu
- Discocalyx crinita A.C.Sm. – south-central Viti Levu
- Discocalyx fusca Gibbs – Viti Levu and Vanua Levu
- Embelia deivanuae R.O.Gardner
- Embelia gracilis Turrill – Viti Levu and Taveuni
- Maesa corylifolia A.Gray
- Maesa insularis Gillespie
- Maesa persicifolia A.Gray
- Maesa pickeringii A.Gray
- Maesa vitiensis Seem.
- Myrsine crassiramea (A.C.Sm.) Ricketson & Pipoly – Viti Levu
- Myrsine hadrocarpa (A.C.Sm.) Ricketson & Pipoly
- Myrsine polyantha (A.C.Sm.) Ricketson & Pipoly – north-central Viti Levu
- Tapeinosperma ampliflorum A.C.Sm. – Viti Levu and Kandavu
- Tapeinosperma babucense Mez – Viti Levu
- Tapeinosperma capitatum (A.Gray) Mez
- Tapeinosperma chloranthum A.C.Sm. – northern and northwestern Viti Levu
- Tapeinosperma clavatum Mez
- Tapeinosperma divaricatum (Gillespie) A.C.Sm. – northern and western Viti Levu
- Tapeinosperma grande (Seem.) Mez
- Tapeinosperma greenwoodii A.C.Sm. – northwestern Viti Levu
- Tapeinosperma hornei Mez
- Tapeinosperma ligulifolium A.C.Sm. – Viti Levu and Vanua Levu
- Tapeinosperma megaphyllum (Hemsl.) Mez
- Tapeinosperma multiflorum (Gillespie) A.C.Sm. – northern and central Viti Levu and Vanua Levu

== Proteaceae ==
- Kermadecia ferruginea A.C.Sm.
- Kermadecia vitiensis Turrill

== Pteridaceae ==
- Adiantum hornei Baker – Viti Levu
- Syngramma spathulata (C.Chr.) Holttum – Viti Levu and Vanua Levu
- Taenitis brachysora (Baker) Pic.Serm.

== Putranjivaceae ==
- Drypetes pacifica (I.W.Bailey & A.C.Sm.) A.C.Sm. – Viti Levu and Ovalau

== Rhamnaceae ==
- Alphitonia franguloides var. franguloides
- Emmenosperma micropetalum (A.C.Sm.) M.C.Johnst.
- Gouania richii A.Gray

== Rhizophoraceae ==
- Crossostylis harveyi Benth. – southern Vanua Levu and Viti Levu
- Crossostylis parksii (Gillespie) A.C.Sm. – Viti Levu: Mt. Nanggaranambuluta
- Crossostylis pedunculata A.C.Sm.
- Crossostylis richii (A.Gray) A.C.Sm.
- Crossostylis seemannii (A.Gray) A.Schimp. – southern Viti Levu and Kardavu

== Rubiaceae ==
- Achilleanthus smithii (Fosberg) J.G.Chavez
- Aidia vitiensis (Seem.) Puttock – Ovalau and Vanua Levu
- Airosperma trichotomum (Gillespie) A.C.Sm. – Viti Levu
- Airosperma vanuense S.P.Darwin – Vanua Levu and Taveuni
- Atractocarpus longipes (A.C.Sm.) Puttock
- Atractocarpus pentagonioides (Seem.) Puttock – Taveuni
- Atractocarpus tenuiflorus (A.C.Sm.) Puttock – Lau Group
- Augusta vitiensis (Seem.) J.H.Kirkbr. – Viti Levu and Vanua Levu
- Calycosia callithrix A.C.Sm. – southeastern Viti Levu
- Calycosia lageniformis (Gillespie) A.C.Sm. – northwestern and north-central Viti Levu
- Calycosia macrocyatha Fosberg
- Calycosia petiolata A.Gray – Viti Levu and Ovalau
- Coprosma persicifolia A.Gray
- Cyclophyllum rectinervium (A.C.Sm.) A.C.Sm. & S.P.Darwin – Vanua Levu
- Dolicholobium macgregorii Horne ex Baker
- Eumachia amoena (A.C.Sm.) Barrabé, C.M.Taylor & Razafim.
- Eumachia archboldiana (Fosberg) Barrabé, C.M.Taylor & Razafim.
- Eumachia evansensis (A.C.Sm.) Barrabé, C.M.Taylor & Razafim. – central and northern Viti Levu
- Eumachia incompta (A.C.Sm.) Barrabé, C.M.Taylor & Razafim. – north-central Viti Levu
- Eumachia membranacea (Gillespie) Delprete & J.H.Kirkbr.
- Gardenia anapetes A.C.Sm. – Vanua Levu
- Gardenia candida A.C.Sm. – Vanua Levu: Seanggangga Plateau
- Gardenia gordonii Baker – Viti Levu and Vanua Levu
- Gardenia grievei Horne ex Baker – northern and western Vanua Levu
- Gardenia hillii Horne ex Baker – Vanua Levu and Rambi
- Gardenia hutchinsoniana Turrill – Viti Levu and Ovalau
- Gardenia storckii Oliv. – southeastern Viti Levu
- Gardenia vitiensis Seem. – Vanua Levu: eastern Mathuata
- Gillespiea A.C.Sm.
  - Gillespiea speciosa A.C.Sm. – Vanua Levu
- Guettarda wayaensis R.O.Gardner
- Gynochthodes grayi (Seem.) Razafim. & B.Bremer
- Hedstromia A.C.Sm.
  - Hedstromia latifolia A.C.Sm.
- Hydnophytum grandiflorum Becc.
- Ixora amplexicaulis Gillespie – Viti Levu
- Ixora arestantha A.C.Sm. – southeastern Viti Levu and Ovalau
- Ixora bullata Turrill
- Ixora carewii Horne ex Baker – Viti Levu and Vanua Levu
- Ixora coronata A.C.Sm. – Vanua Levu
- Ixora greenwoodiana A.C.Sm. – Viti Levu: Mt. Evans Range
- Ixora harveyi (A.Gray) A.C.Sm. – Vanua Levu and Taveuni
- Ixora maxima Seem. – southeastern Viti Levu and northern Vanua Levu
- Ixora myrsinoides A.C.Sm. – Viti Levu: northern Mt. Namendre
- Ixora myrtifolia A.C.Sm. – southwestern Vanua Levu
- Ixora nandarivatensis Gillespie – northern & central Viti Levu
- Ixora pedionoma A.C.Sm. – Vanua Levu: Seanggangga Plateau
- Ixora pelagica Seem.
- Ixora prolixa A.C.Sm. – Loma-i-Viti Is. and Lau Group
- Ixora pubifolia A.C.Sm. – southeastern Vanua Levu and southeastern Viti Levu
- Ixora richardi-longii Govaerts – Vanau Levu: northern Mt. Numbuiloa
- Ixora somosomaensis Gillespie – Vanua Levu and Taveuni
- Ixora storckii Seem. – Viti Levu and Ovalau
- Ixora tubiflora A.C.Sm. – Taveuni
- Ixora vitiensis A.Gray
- Mastixiodendron flavidum (Seem.) A.C.Sm.
- Mastixiodendron pilosum A.C.Sm. – Viti Levu and Vanua Levu
- Mastixiodendron robustum A.C.Sm. – Viti Levu and Vanua Levu
- Ophiorrhiza peploides A.Gray
- Psychotria ampullacea A.C.Sm. – Viti Levu
- Psychotria araiosantha A.C.Sm. & S.P.Darwin – Vanua Levu
- Psychotria argantha A.C.Sm. – Vanua Levu
- Psychotria asae (Kuntze) ined. – Vanua Levu
- Psychotria aurantiocarpa Fosberg – Vanua Levu: Mt. Mariko
- Psychotria brachythrix A.C.Sm. – Vanua Levu: Mbua
- Psychotria brackenridgei A.Gray
- Psychotria brevicalyx Fosberg
- Psychotria broweri Seem.
- Psychotria bullata Seem. – Viti Levu and Vanua Levu
- Psychotria calycosa A.Gray – Ovalau
- Psychotria confertiloba A.C.Sm.
- Psychotria cordata A.Gray
- Psychotria crassiflora Fosberg – south-central Viti Levu
- Psychotria diffusiflora A.C.Sm. – central and north-central Viti Levu
- Psychotria edentata A.C.Sm. – Lau Group
- Psychotria eumorphanthus Fosberg – north-central Viti Levu and Taveuni
- Psychotria exilis A.C.Sm. – Vanua Levu
- Psychotria filipes A.Gray – south-central Viti Levu and Ovalau
- Psychotria fragrans (Gillespie) Fosberg – south-central Viti Levu and Taveuni
- Psychotria furcans Fosberg – Viti Levu and Vanua Levu
- Psychotria gibbsiae S.Moore
- Psychotria gillespieana A.C.Sm. – western and central Viti Levu
- Psychotria glabra (Turrill) Fosberg
- Psychotria gracilior A.C.Sm. – Viti Levu
- Psychotria griseifolia S.Moore – north-central Viti Levu
- Psychotria hunteri (Horne ex Baker) A.C.Sm.
- Psychotria hypargyraea A.Gray
- Psychotria impercepta A.C.Sm. & S.P.Darwin
- Psychotria imthurnii Turrill
- Psychotria jugalis A.C.Sm. – Viti Levu: Mba
- Psychotria koroiveibaui A.C.Sm.
- Psychotria kuruvolii A.C.Sm. – Vanua Levu: Mbua
- Psychotria leptantha A.C.Sm. – Viti Levu: Mt. Evans Range
- Psychotria leucocalyx A.C.Sm. – north-central Viti Levu
- Psychotria levuensis Gillespie – Viti Levu
- Psychotria macrocalyx A.Gray
- Psychotria macroserpens Fosberg – Kambara
- Psychotria magnifica (Gillespie) Fosberg – central Viti Levu
- Psychotria monocarpa Fosberg – Vanua Levu
- Psychotria nandarivatensis A.C.Sm.
- Psychotria pachyantha A.C.Sm. – Vanua Levu and Yathata I.
- Psychotria parvula A.Gray
- Psychotria pickeringii A.Gray
- Psychotria pittosporifolia Fosberg – Viti Levu
- Psychotria platycocca A.Gray
- Psychotria podantha (Fosberg) A.C.Sm. – north-central Viti Levu
- Psychotria prismoclavata (Fosberg) A.C.Sm. – Viti Levu
- Psychotria pritchardii Seem. – Vanua Levu and Taveuni
- Psychotria pubiflora (A.Gray) Fosberg – southeastern Viti Levu and Kandavu
- Psychotria roseata (Fosberg) A.C.Sm. – north-central Viti Levu
- Psychotria rufocalyx Fosberg – Vanua Levu: Mbua
- Psychotria scitula A.C.Sm. – Viti Levu: Mt. Voma
- Psychotria solanoides Turrill
- Psychotria st-johnii Fosberg – Viti Levu
- Psychotria stenantha A.C.Sm. – Viti Levu: Mt. Evans Range
- Psychotria storckii Seem.
- Psychotria taviunensis Gillespie
- Psychotria tephrosantha A.Gray
- Psychotria tetragonoides Fosberg – Viti Levu
- Psychotria timonioides Fosberg – Viti Levu: Serua
- Psychotria tomaniviensis A.C.Sm. – Viti Levu
- Psychotria turbinata A.Gray – Viti Levu and Ovalau
- Psychotria unicarinata (Fosberg) A.C.Sm. & S.P.Darwin – Viti Levu
- Psychotria valleculata A.C.Sm. – northwestern Viti Levu
- Psychotria vescula A.C.Sm. – western Viti Levu
- Psychotria vitiensis Fosberg – south-central Viti Levu
- Psychotria volii R.O.Gardner
- Psychotria vomensis Gillespie – Viti Levu: Namosi
- Squamellaria grayi Chomicki & Wistuba
- Squamellaria huxleyana Chomicki
- Squamellaria imberbis (A.Gray) Becc. – Vanua Levu
- Squamellaria major A.C.Sm. – Taveuni: Mt. Manuka
- Squamellaria thekii Jebb
- Tarenna joskei (Horne ex Baker) A.C.Sm. & S.P.Darwin – southeastern Viti Levu
- Tarenna seemanniana A.C.Sm. & S.P.Darwin
- Timonius affinis var. sapotifolius (A.Gray) Fosberg – Ovalau

== Rutaceae ==
- Melicope capillacea (Gillespie) A.C.Sm. – Viti Levu and Taveuni
- Melicope evansensis (A.C.Sm.) A.C.Sm. – northwestern Viti Levu
- Melicope flaviflora A.C.Sm. – Viti Levu
- Melicope homoeophylla A.C.Sm. – Viti Levu and Vanua Levu
- Melicope robusta A.C.Sm. – Viti Levu and Ovalau
- Melicope taveuniensis A.C.Sm. – Viti Levu, Taveuni
- Sarcomelicope petiolaris (A.Gray) A.C.Sm.
- Wenzelia kambarae Swingle – Lau Group
- Zanthoxylum gillespieanum (A.C.Sm.) A.C.Sm. – Viti Levu
- Zanthoxylum myrianthum (A.C.Sm.) P.G.Waterman – Vanua Levu
- Zanthoxylum vitiense A.C.Sm. – Viti Levu, Vanua Levu

== Saccolomataceae ==
- Saccoloma ferulaceum (T.Moore) R.M.Tryon & A.F.Tryon – Viti Levu

== Salicaceae ==
- Casearia adiantoides Sleumer – Vanua Levu: Mt. Seatura
- Casearia angustifolia A.C.Sm. – Vanua Levu: Mt. Mariko
- Casearia crassipes A.C.Sm. – Vanua Levu
- Casearia fissistipula A.C.Sm. – Viti Levu
- Casearia longifolia A.C.Sm. – Viti Levu and Yasawar
- Casearia myrsinoides Sleumer – Vanua Levu
- Casearia parhamii A.C.Sm. – Viti Levu
- Casearia procera A.C.Sm.
- Casearia pubipes A.C.Sm. – Yathata
- Casearia richii A.Gray
- Casearia stenophylla A.C.Sm. – Vanua Levu and Taveuni
- Flacourtia amalotricha A.C.Sm. – Viti Levu
- Flacourtia degeneri A.C.Sm. – Viti Levu
- Flacourtia mollipila Sleumer – Viti Levu
- Flacourtia subintegra A.C.Sm.
- Flacourtia vitiensis (Seem.) A.C.Sm. – Viti Levu and Vanua Levu
- Homalium laurifolium A.C.Sm. – eastern and southeastern Viti Levu
- Homalium nitens Turrill – Viti Levu
- Homalium pallidum A.C.Sm. – Lau Group
- Homalium vitiense Benth.

== Santalaceae ==
- Exocarpos vitiensis A.C.Sm.

== Sapindaceae ==
- Alectryon grandifolius A.C.Sm.
- Alectryon vitiensis Buerki, Lowry, Munzinger & Callm.
- Allophylus umbrinus A.C.Sm. – northwestern Viti Levu
- Cossinia pacifica A.C.Sm. – central Vanua Levu
- Cupaniopsis amoena A.C.Sm. – Viti Levu
- Cupaniopsis vitiensis Radlk.
- Elattostachys venosus A.C.Sm.
- Guioa capillacea A.C.Sm. – Vanua Levu
- Guioa chrysea A.C.Sm.
- Guioa punctata Welzen
- Koelreuteria elegans subsp. elegans
- Lepidocupania concolor (Gillespie) Buerki, Callm., Munzinger & Lowry

== Sapotaceae ==
- Burckella fijiensis (Hemsl.) A.C.Sm. & S.P.Darwin
- Burckella hillii (Horne ex Baker) H.J.Lam – Rambi and eastern Viti Levu
- Burckella parvifolia A.C.Sm. & S.P.Darwin – southeastern Viti Levu
- Burckella thurstonii (Hemsl.) H.J.Lam – southeastern Viti Levu
- Manilkara smithiana H.J.Lam & Maas Geest.
- Manilkara vitiensis (H.J.Lam & Olden) B.Meeuse
- Palaquium fidjiense Pierre ex Dubard
- Palaquium hornei (Hartog ex Baker) Dubard
- Palaquium porphyreum A.C.Sm. & S.P.Darwin
- Palaquium vitilevuense Gilly ex P.Royen – Viti Levu
- Planchonella brevipes A.C.Sm. – Vanua Levu: Mt. Mbatini
- Planchonella pyrulifera (A.Gray) H.J.Lam ex P.Royen
- Planchonella sessilis A.C.Sm. & S.P.Darwin – Viti Levu
- Planchonella smithii (P.Royen) A.C.Sm.
- Planchonella umbonata (P.Royen) A.C.Sm.
- Planchonella vitiensis Gillespie

== Selaginellaceae ==
- Selaginella decurrens Hieron.
- Selaginella victoriae W.Bull
- Selaginella viridangula Spring

== Simaroubaceae ==
- Soulamea soulameoides (A.Gray) Noot.

== Solanaceae ==
- Solanum pseudopedunculatum D.H.R.McClell. – Vanua Levu
- Solanum ratale D.H.R.McClell. – Viti Levu

== Stemonuraceae ==
- Medusanthera howardii Utteridge

== Symplocaceae ==
- Symplocos turrilliana A.C.Sm. – Viti Levu

== Thymelaeaceae ==
- Gonystylus punctatus A.C.Sm. – Viti Levu
- Phaleria angustifolia A.C.Sm. – Vanua Levu
- Phaleria ixoroides Fosberg
- Phaleria lanceolata (A.Gray) Gilg – Vanua Levu
- Phaleria montana (Seem.) Gilg
- Phaleria pubiflora (Seem.) Gilg
- Phaleria pulchra Gillespie – Viti Levu

== Urticaceae ==
- Elatostema comptonioides A.C.Sm. – Vanua Levu
- Elatostema epallocaulum A.C.Sm. – Viti Levu
- Elatostema fruticosum Gibbs – Viti Levu
- Elatostema gillespiei A.C.Sm. – Viti Levu
- Elatostema greenwoodii A.C.Sm. – northwestern Viti Levu
- Elatostema humile A.C.Sm.
- Elatostema insulare A.C.Sm.
- Elatostema palustre A.C.Sm. – Viti Levu
- Elatostema seemannianum A.C.Sm.
- Elatostema tenellum A.C.Sm.
- Elatostema vitiense (A.Gray ex Wedd.) A.C.Sm.
- Elatostematoides australis (Wedd.) Yu Hsin Tseng, A.K.Monro, Y.G.Wei & J.M.Hu
- Elatostematoides filicoides (Seem.) Yu Hsin Tseng, A.K.Monro, Y.G.Wei & J.M.Hu – Viti Levu
- Pipturus platyphyllus Wedd.
- Procris anfracta (A.C.Sm.) A.C.Sm. – Taveuni
- Procris archboldiana A.C.Sm. – Viti Levu
- Procris goepeliana (A.C.Sm.) A.C.Sm.

== Vitaceae ==
- Cayratia seemanniana A.C.Sm.

== Zingiberaceae ==
- Alpinia boia Seem.
- Alpinia horneana K.Schum. – Viti Levu
- Alpinia macrocephala K.Schum.
- Alpinia parksii (Gillespie) A.C.Sm.
- Alpinia vitiensis Seem.
