= Bulbophyllum sect. Papulipetalum =

Scientific classification
- Kingdom: Plantae
- Clade: Tracheophytes
- Clade: Angiosperms
- Clade: Monocots
- Order: Asparagales
- Family: Orchidaceae
- Subfamily: Epidendroideae
- Genus: Bulbophyllum
- Section: Bulbophyllum sect. Papulipetalum; Schlechter 1913

Type species
- Bulbophyllum papulipetalum

Species
- See text

Synonyms
- Papulipetalum (Schltr.) M.A.Clem. & D.L.Jones, 2002.

Section of flowering plants

Bulbophyllum sect. Papulipetalum is a section of the genus Bulbophyllum.

== Description ==
Species in this section have sepals that are unequal, the laterals are longer than the dorsal and the petals as well have apical hairs.

== Distribution ==
Plants from this section are found in New Guinea.

== Species ==
Bulbophyllum section Papulipetalum comprises the following species:

Image	Name	Distribution	Elevation (m)
	Bulbophyllum acropogon Schltr. 1913	New Guinea	1,400–1,600 metres (4,600–5,200 ft)
	Bulbophyllum arsoanum J.J.Sm. 1912	New Guinea	350–450 metres (1,150–1,480 ft)
	Bulbophyllum aspersum J.J.Sm. 1912	New Guinea	
	Bulbophyllum brachychilum Schltr. 1913	New Guinea	400 metres (1,300 ft)
	Bulbophyllum brevilabium Schltr. 1913	New Guinea	700 metres (2,300 ft)
	Bulbophyllum conspersum J.J.Sm. 1913	New Guinea	400 metres (1,300 ft)
	Bulbophyllum densibulbum W.Kittr. 1984 publ. 1985	New Guinea	
	Bulbophyllum dischorense Schltr. 1913	New Guinea	1,300 metres (4,300 ft)
	Bulbophyllum dschischungarense Schltr. 1913	New Guinea	1,000 metres (3,300 ft)
	Bulbophyllum ellipticifolium J.J.Sm. 1935	New Guinea	175–250 metres (574–820 ft)
	Bulbophyllum falcifolium Schltr. 1913	New Guinea	1,000 metres (3,300 ft)
	Bulbophyllum heterosepalum Schltr. 1913	New Guinea	150 metres (490 ft)
	Bulbophyllum hians Schltr. 1913	New Guinea	1,300–1,800 metres (4,300–5,900 ft)
	Bulbophyllum longipedicellatum J.J. Sm. 1910	Papua and New Guinea	820–900 metres (2,690–2,950 ft)
	Bulbophyllum lorentzianum J.J.Sm. 1910	New Guinea	440 metres (1,440 ft)
	Bulbophyllum melilotus J.J.Sm. 1929	New Guinea	
	Bulbophyllum muriceum Schltr. 1913	New Guinea	1,200 metres (3,900 ft)
	Bulbophyllum papulipetalum J.J.Sm. 1913	New Guinea	800 metres (2,600 ft)
	Bulbophyllum phaeorhabdos Schltr. 1923	New Guinea	1,000 metres (3,300 ft)
	Bulbophyllum rivulare Schltr. 1913	New Guinea	1,300–2,400 metres (4,300–7,900 ft)
	Bulbophyllum roseopunctatum J.J.Sm. 1913	New Guinea	400 metres (1,300 ft)
	Bulbophyllum samoanum Schltr. 1911	New Hebrides, Fiji, New Caledonia and Samoa	300–900 metres (980–2,950 ft)
	Bulbophyllum sauguetiense J.J.Sm. 1913	New Guinea	2,300 metres (7,500 ft)
	Bulbophyllum schizodon J.J.Verm., Schuit. & de Vogel 2018	Papua and New Guinea	900 metres (3,000 ft)
	Bulbophyllum simmondsii Kores 1989	Fiji	
	Bulbophyllum spathipetalum J.J.Sm. 1908	New Guinea	
	Bulbophyllum sandfordiorum Saputra & Schuit. 2025	Papua	
