= Bulbophyllum sect. Schistopetalum =

Scientific classification
- Kingdom: Plantae
- Clade: Tracheophytes
- Clade: Angiosperms
- Clade: Monocots
- Order: Asparagales
- Family: Orchidaceae
- Subfamily: Epidendroideae
- Genus: Bulbophyllum
- Section: Bulbophyllum sect. Schistopetalum; Schltr. 1913

Type species
- Bulbophyllum schistopetalum

Species
- See text

Section of flowering plants

Bulbophyllum sect. Schistopetalum is a section of the genus Bulbophyllum.

== Description ==
Species in this section are epiphytes with a single inflorescence with amplexicaul floral bracts.

== Distribution ==
Plants from this section are found in New Guinea.

== Species ==
Bulbophyllum section Schistopetalum comprises the following species:

Image	Name	Distribution	Elevation (m)
	Bulbophyllum aristopetalum Kores 1989	Fiji	
	Bulbophyllum barbasapientis J.J.Verm. & P.O'Byrne 2008	Sulawesi	1,000 metres (3,300 ft)
	Bulbophyllum barbavagabundum J.J.Verm. 2008	western New Guinea	450 metres (1,480 ft)
	Bulbophyllum chimaera Schltr. 1913	Papua and New Guinea	1,000 metres (3,300 ft)
	Bulbophyllum distichobulbum P.J.Cribb 1995	Samoa and Niue	130–270 metres (430–890 ft)
	Bulbophyllum filamentosum Schltr. 1913	New Guinea	700 metres (2,300 ft)
	Bulbophyllum fissipetalum Schltr. 1913	New Guinea	40 metres (130 ft)
	Bulbophyllum hasallii Kores 1989	Solomon Islands, Fiji and Niue	
	Bulbophyllum schistopetalum Schltr. 1905	Bismark Archipelago	600 metres (2,000 ft)
	Bulbophyllum trigonidioides J.J.Sm. 1935	western New Guinea	600 metres (2,000 ft)
	Bulbophyllum whitteniorum Saputra, Schuit., Metusala & Heatubun 2023	Papua and New Guinea	
