= Neuburgia =

Scientific classification
- Kingdom: Plantae
- Clade: Tracheophytes
- Clade: Angiosperms
- Clade: Eudicots
- Clade: Asterids
- Order: Gentianales
- Family: Loganiaceae
- Genus: Neuburgia; Blume

Genus of plants

Neuburgia is a genus of plants in the family Loganiaceae. It is native to the Bismarck Archipelago, Caroline Islands, Fiji, Maluku Islands, New Caledonia, New Guinea, Philippines, Solomon Islands, Sulawesi, and Vanuatu. It contains the following species (but this list may be incomplete):

- Neuburgia alata (A.C.Sm.) A.C.Smith
- Neuburgia celebica (Koord.) Leenh.
- Neuburgia collina (A.C.Sm) A.C.Smith
- Neuburgia corynocarpa (A.Gray) Leenh.
- Neuburgia kochii (Valeton) Leenh.
- Neuburgia macrocarpa (A.C.Sm.) A.C.Smith
- Neuburgia macroloba (A.C.Sm.) A.C.Smith
- Neuburgia moluccana (Scheff. ex Boerl.) Leenh.
- Neuburgia novocaledonica (Gilg & Gilg-Ben.) J.E.Molina & Struwe
- Neuburgia rumphiana Leenh.
- Neuburgia tuberculata Blume
- Neuburgia tubiflora Bl.
