= Heterospathe elegans =

Scientific classification
- Kingdom: Plantae
- Clade: Tracheophytes
- Clade: Angiosperms
- Clade: Monocots
- Clade: Commelinids
- Order: Arecales
- Family: Arecaceae
- Genus: Heterospathe
- Species: H. elegans

Binomial name
- Heterospathe elegans (Becc.) Becc.

Synonyms
- Barkerwebbia elegans Becc.; Heterospathe elegans subsp. elegans; Heterospathe versteegiana Becc.

Species of palm

Heterospathe elegans is a species of flowering plants in the palm family (Arecaceae). It is found in New Guinea.
