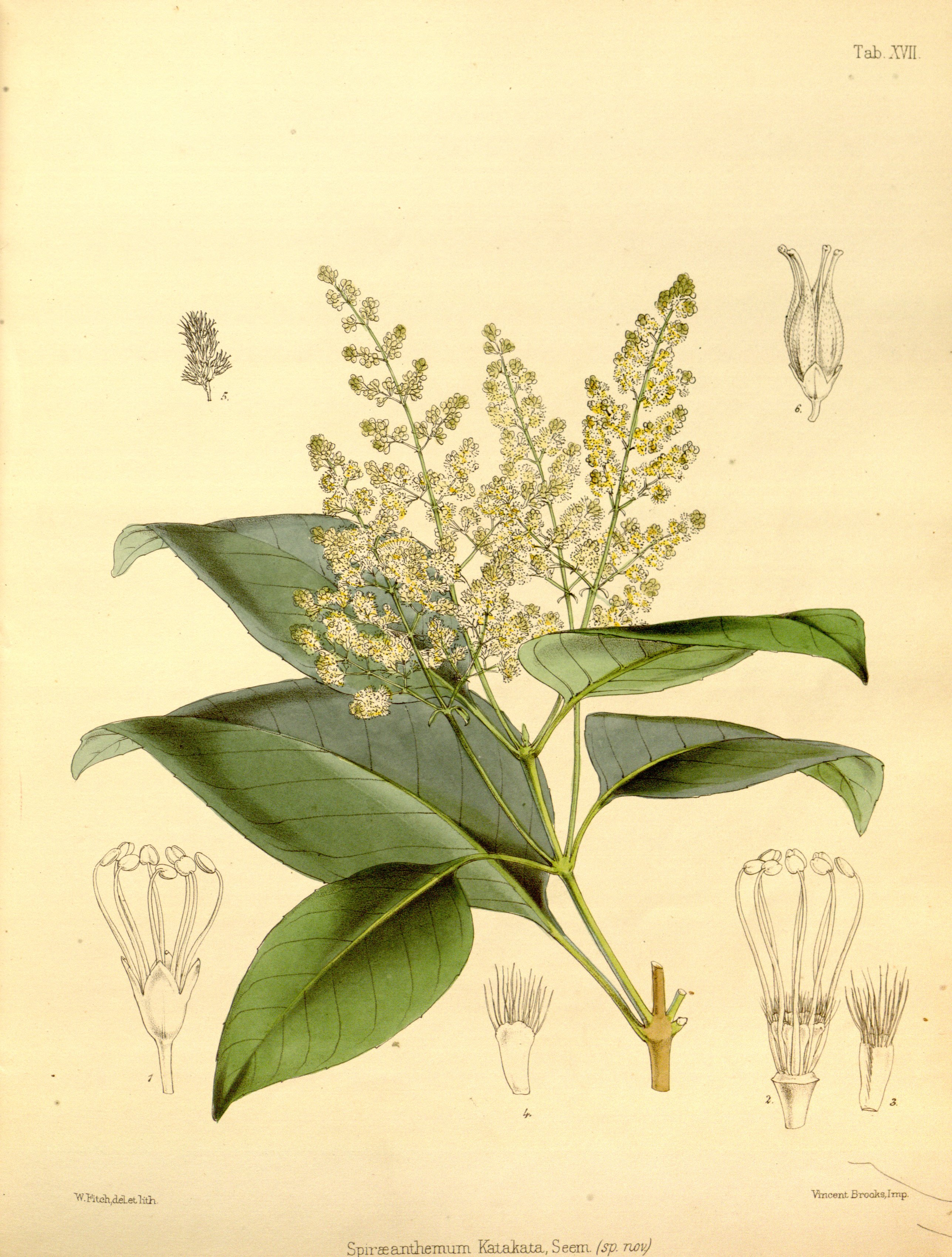
- Spiraeanthemum katakata

Scientific classification
- Kingdom: Plantae
- Clade: Tracheophytes
- Clade: Angiosperms
- Clade: Eudicots
- Clade: Rosids
- Order: Oxalidales
- Family: Cunoniaceae
- Genus: Spiraeanthemum; A.Gray
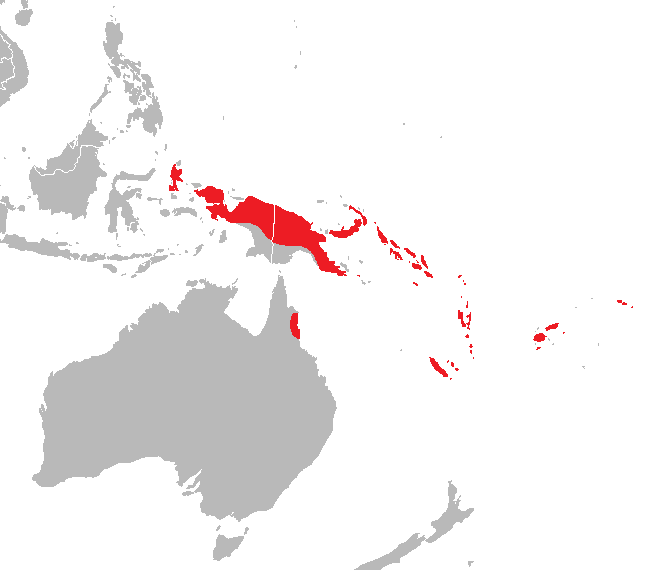

Synonyms
- Acsmithia Hoogland

= Spiraeanthemum =

Genus of flowering plants

Spiraeanthemum is a genus of trees and shrubs in the family Cunoniaceae. It includes about 19 species from Australia, New Guinea, Solomon Islands, New Caledonia, Vanuatu, Fiji and Samoa. Leaves are simple, opposite or whorled, with toothed or entire margins. Inflorescences are paniculate, flowers unisexual or hermaphrodite, and the fruits are follicular with free carpels. It belongs to the tribe Spiraeanthemeae, and now includes the species formerly placed in Acsmithia.

== Species ==
As of February 2026, Plants of the World Online accepts the following 19 species:

Australia

- Spiraeanthemum davidsonii F. Muell.

New Guinea and Moluccas

- Spiraeanthemum integrifolium Pulle
- Spiraeanthemum parvifolium Schltr.
- Spiraeanthemum pulleana Schltr.
- Spiraeanthemum reticulatum Schltr.

Solomon Islands, New Britain, New Ireland and Bougainville

- Spiraeanthemum bougainvillense Hoogland
- Spiraeanthemum macgillivrayi Seem. subsp. kajewskii (Perry) Hoogland

Vanuatu

- Spiraeanthemum macgillivrayi Seem. subsp. macgillivrayi

New Caledonia

- Spiraeanthemum brongniartianum Schltr.
- Spiraeanthemum collinum (Hoogland) Pillon
- Spiraeanthemum densiflorum Brongn. & Gris
- Spiraeanthemum ellipticum Vieill. ex Pamp.
- Spiraeanthemum meridionale (Hoogland) Pillon
- Spiraeanthemum pedunculatum Schltr.
- Spiraeanthemum pubescens Pamp.

Fiji

- Spiraeanthemum graeffei Seem.
- Spiraeanthemum katakata Seem.
- Spiraeanthemum serratum Gillespie
- Spiraeanthemum vitiense A. Gray

Samoa

- Spiraeanthemum samoense A. Gray
