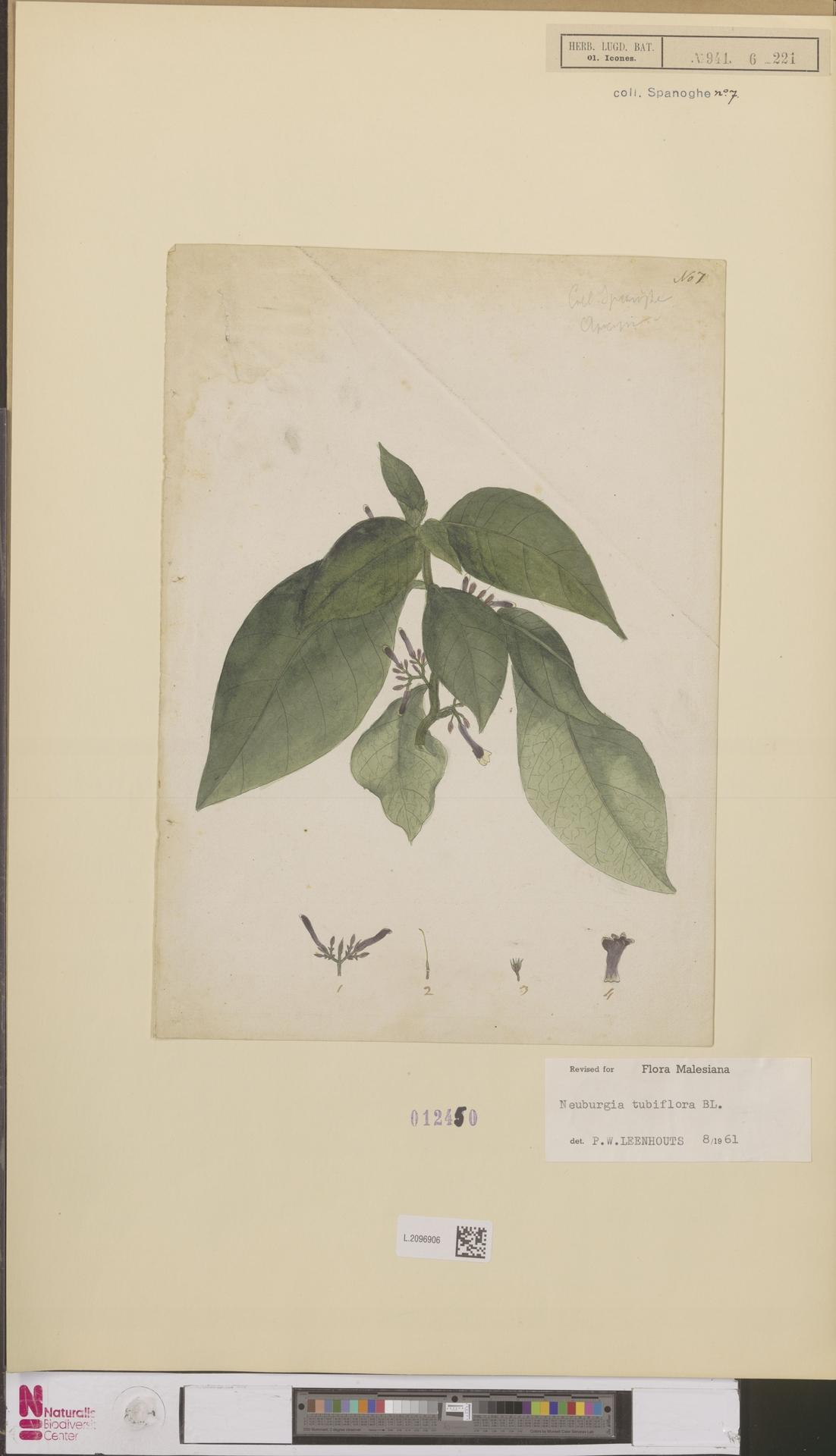

Conservation status
- Data Deficient (IUCN 3.1)

Scientific classification
- Kingdom: Plantae
- Clade: Tracheophytes
- Clade: Angiosperms
- Clade: Eudicots
- Clade: Asterids
- Order: Gentianales
- Family: Loganiaceae
- Genus: Neuburgia
- Species: N. tubiflora

Binomial name
- Neuburgia tubiflora Blume

= Neuburgia tubiflora =

Species of plant

Neuburgia tubiflora is a species of flowering plant in the Loganiaceae family. It is a shrub or small tree endemic to Western New Guinea, It grows in lowland rain forest.
