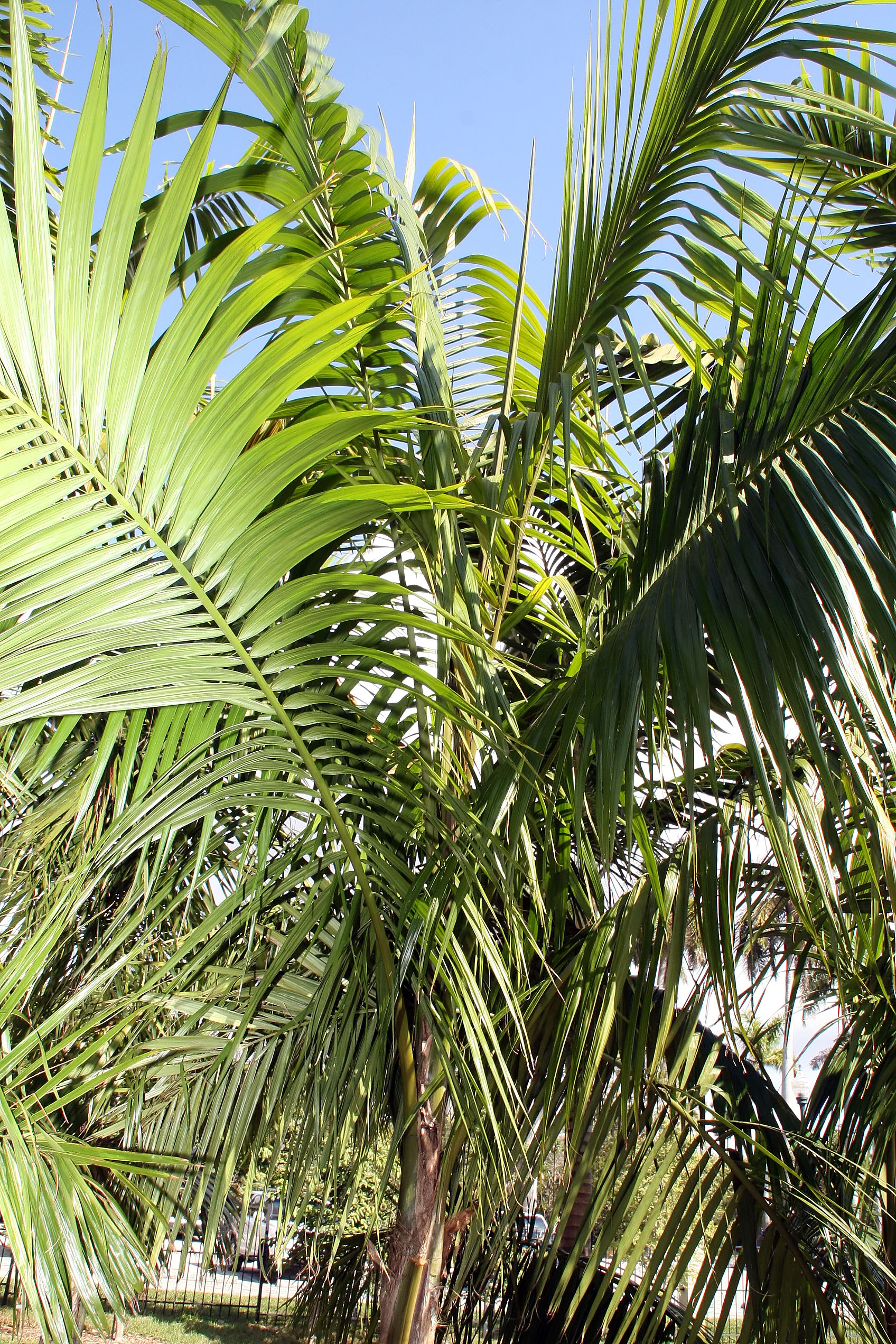
- Heterospathe elata

Scientific classification
- Kingdom: Plantae
- Clade: Embryophytes
- Clade: Tracheophytes
- Clade: Angiosperms
- Clade: Monocots
- Clade: Commelinids
- Order: Arecales
- Family: Arecaceae
- Subfamily: Arecoideae
- Tribe: Areceae
- Genus: Heterospathe; Scheff.

Synonyms
- Ptychandra Scheff.; Barkerwebbia Becc.; Alsmithia H.E.Moore

= Heterospathe =

Genus of palms

Heterospathe is a monoecious genus of flowering plant in the palm family found in Oceania, where it is called sagisi palm. With 39 species, Heterospathe is named from a Greek combination of "various" and "spathe", which describes the two distinct bract types.

== Description ==
They exhibit considerable variation in morphology and habit; the slender trunks may be solitary or sparsely to densely clustering, some are miniatures and perpetual undergrowth subjects while others contribute to the canopy top. The trunks are ringed by leaf scars and end in a poorly defined or absent crownshaft. The leaves are usually pinnate, rarely bifid, from small to large, and frequently red colored when new.

The inflorescence is interfoliar but will hang pendent nearing antithesis. It may be branched from one to four orders with short white to yellow branches of spirally arranged, male and female flowers. Ellipsoidal to spherical, the fruit ripen to various shades of orange and red and contain a single seed.

== Distribution and habitat ==
Heterospathe species are relatively widespread across the Pacific's western edges with several in New Guinea, the Philippines, the Solomon Islands, eastern Indonesia and Micronesia. Across this range they inhabit montane and lowland rain forest, in some cases receiving total shade or filtered light while others mature into full sun with age; H. delicatula and H. humilis are found at high elevations in New Guinea's mountains. Being rain forest dwellers they are typically found in humus-rich soil.

== Species ==
- Heterospathe annectens H.E.Moore - New Guinea
- Heterospathe arfakiana (Becc.) H.E.Moore - New Guinea
- Heterospathe barfodii L.M.Gardiner & W.J.Baker - Papua
- Heterospathe brevicaulis Fernando - Luzon
- Heterospathe cagayanensis Becc. - Luzon
- Heterospathe califrons Fernando - Philippines
- Heterospathe clemensiae (Burret) H.E.Moore - New Guinea
- Heterospathe compsoclada (Burret) Heatubun - New Guinea
- Heterospathe delicatula H.E.Moore - New Guinea
- Heterospathe dransfieldii Fernando - Palawan
- Heterospathe elata Scheff - Philippines, Maluku, New Guinea, Micronesia
- Heterospathe elegans (Becc.) Becc. - New Guinea
- Heterospathe elmeri Becc. - Philippines
- Heterospathe glabra (Burret) H.E.Moore - New Guinea
- Heterospathe glauca (Scheff.) H.E.Moore - Maluku
- Heterospathe intermedia (Becc.) Fernando - Philippines
- Heterospathe kajewskii Burret - Solomon Islands
- Heterospathe ledermanniana Becc. - New Guinea
- Heterospathe lepidota H.E.Moore - New Guinea
- Heterospathe longipes (H.E.Moore) Norup - Fiji
- Heterospathe macgregorii (Becc.) H.E.Moore - New Guinea
- Heterospathe minor Burret - Solomon Islands
- Heterospathe muelleriana (Becc.) Becc. - New Guinea
- Heterospathe negrosensis Becc. - Philippines
- Heterospathe obriensis (Becc.) H.E.Moore - New Guinea
- Heterospathe parviflora Essig - Bismarck Archipelago
- Heterospathe philippinensis (Becc.) Becc. - Philippines
- Heterospathe phillipsii D.Fuller & Dowe - Fiji
- Heterospathe pilosa (Burret) Burret - New Guinea
- Heterospathe porcata W.J.Baker & Heatubun - Western New Guinea
- Heterospathe pulchra H.E.Moore - Papua New Guinea
- Heterospathe pullenii M.S.Trudgen & W.J.Baker - Papua New Guinea
- Heterospathe ramulosa Burret - Solomon Islands
- Heterospathe salomonensis Becc. - Solomon Islands
- Heterospathe scitula Fernando - Luzon
- Heterospathe sensisi Becc. - Solomon Islands
- Heterospathe sibuyanensis Becc. - Sibuyan
- Heterospathe sphaerocarpa Burret - New Guinea
- Heterospathe trispatha Fernando - Luzon
- Heterospathe uniformis Dowe - Vanuatu
- Heterospathe woodfordiana Becc. - Solomon Islands

== Cultivation and uses ==
The colorful new foliage has increased their popularity in Australia though they are still uncommon there and more so in the United States where only one species is cultivated with any regularity. In any case, they naturally prefer surroundings resembling those in their range, particularly acidic soil which is fast-draining, copious water and protection from cold. The petioles and leaflets are woven and thatched, the palm heart is reportedly eaten, and fruit from H. elata is chewed as a betel substitute.
