= Cyphosperma =

Scientific classification
- Kingdom: Plantae
- Clade: Tracheophytes
- Clade: Angiosperms
- Clade: Monocots
- Clade: Commelinids
- Order: Arecales
- Family: Arecaceae
- Subfamily: Arecoideae
- Tribe: Areceae
- Subtribe: Basseliniinae
- Genus: Cyphosperma; H.Wendl. ex Hook.f.

Synonyms
- Taveunia Burret

Genus of palms

Cyphosperma is a genus of flowering plants in the family Arecaceae, native to various islands of the Pacific. It contains the following species:

- Cyphosperma balansae (Brongn.) H.Wendl. ex Salomon - New Caledonia
- Cyphosperma naboutinense Hodel & Marcus - Fiji
- Cyphosperma tanga (H.E.Moore) H.E.Moore - Fiji
- Cyphosperma trichospadix (Burret) H.E.Moore - Fiji
- Cyphosperma voutmelensis Dowe - Vanuatu
