= Cyphosperma voutmelensis =

Conservation status
- Endangered (IUCN 2.3)

Scientific classification
- Kingdom: Plantae
- Clade: Tracheophytes
- Clade: Angiosperms
- Clade: Monocots
- Clade: Commelinids
- Order: Arecales
- Family: Arecaceae
- Genus: Cyphosperma
- Species: C. voutmelensis

Binomial name
- Cyphosperma voutmelensis Dowe

Species of palm

Cyphosperma voutmelensis is a species of flowering plant in the family Arecaceae. It is found only in Vanuatu. It is threatened by habitat loss.
