= Gillespiea =

Scientific classification
- Kingdom: Plantae
- Clade: Tracheophytes
- Clade: Angiosperms
- Clade: Eudicots
- Clade: Asterids
- Order: Gentianales
- Family: Rubiaceae
- Subfamily: Rubioideae
- Tribe: Psychotrieae
- Genus: Gillespiea; A.C.Sm.
- Species: G. speciosa

Binomial name
- Gillespiea speciosa A.C.Sm.

Genus of plants

Gillespiea is a monotypic genus of flowering plants in the family Rubiaceae. The genus contains only one species, viz. Gillespiea speciosa, which is endemic to the island of Vanua Levu in Fiji.
