= Neuburgia macroloba =

Conservation status
- Endangered (IUCN 2.3)

Scientific classification
- Kingdom: Plantae
- Clade: Tracheophytes
- Clade: Angiosperms
- Clade: Eudicots
- Clade: Asterids
- Order: Gentianales
- Family: Loganiaceae
- Genus: Neuburgia
- Species: N. macroloba

Binomial name
- Neuburgia macroloba (A.C.Sm.) A.C.Smith

Species of plant

Neuburgia macroloba is a species of flowering plant in the family Loganiaceae. It is endemic to Fiji, where it is known only from the island of Taveuni. There are six known subpopulations with just a few individuals each. It grows in dense forest habitat.
