= Spiraeanthemum vitiense =

Conservation status
- Endangered (IUCN 3.1)

Scientific classification
- Kingdom: Plantae
- Clade: Embryophytes
- Clade: Tracheophytes
- Clade: Angiosperms
- Clade: Eudicots
- Clade: Rosids
- Order: Oxalidales
- Family: Cunoniaceae
- Genus: Spiraeanthemum
- Species: S. vitiense

Binomial name
- Spiraeanthemum vitiense A.Gray

Synonyms
- Acsmithia vitiense (A.Gray) Hoogland

Species of flowering plant

Spiraeanthemum vitiense, formerly known as Acsmithia vitiense, is a species of flowering plant in the family Cunoniaceae. It is a shrub or tree endemic to Fiji.
