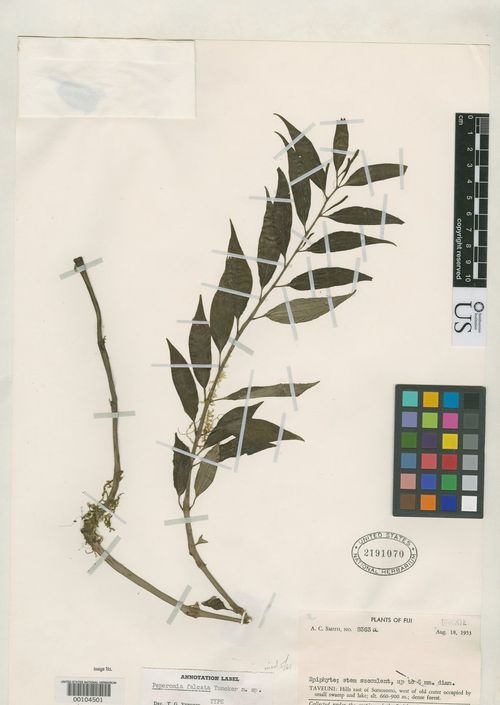

Scientific classification
- Kingdom: Plantae
- Clade: Embryophytes
- Clade: Tracheophytes
- Clade: Spermatophytes
- Clade: Angiosperms
- Clade: Magnoliids
- Order: Piperales
- Family: Piperaceae
- Genus: Peperomia
- Species: P. falcata

Binomial name
- Peperomia falcata Yunck.

= Peperomia falcata =

Species of plant

Peperomia falcata is a species of subshrub in the genus Peperomia that is endemic in Fiji. It grows on wet tropical biomes. Its conservation status is Threatened.

== Description ==
The type specimen were collected near Somosomo, Fiji.

Peperomia falcata is a succulent, epiphytic herb that can grow over 40 cm (16 in) tall. Its single, unbranched stem arises from a decumbent, rooting base and is covered in crisp hairs about 0.5 mm long. The leaves are arranged alternately on the upper stem but oppositely toward the base. They are elliptic-lanceolate, measuring about 6 cm long and 1–1.5 cm wide, with a distinctive, long sickle-shaped (falcate) tip and an acute to wedge-shaped base. The upper leaf surface is mostly glabrous, while the veins beneath are pubescent, and the margins are ciliolate above the middle. The leaves are palmately 3–5-nerved and dry to a membranous, translucent texture. The petioles are slender, grooved, and crisp-pubescent, ranging from 3–5 mm long on upper leaves to about 1 cm on lower leaves. The immature spikes are solitary, axillary or terminal, and about 1.5–1.7 cm long, with glabrous peduncles. The bracts are round-peltate. The ovoid ovary features an apical stigma.

This species is characterized by its narrow, (falcate) leaves and its crisp pubescence. It most closely resembles P. lasiostigma and P. attenuata, but differs from them in its longer petioles, the distinctive falcate shape of its leaf tips, and its solitary spikes.

== Taxonomy and naming ==
It was described in 1956 by Truman G. Yuncker in Bulletin of the Torrey Botanical Club 83, from specimens collected by Albert Charles Smith. It got its name from description of the species.

== Distribution and habitat ==
It is endemic in Fiji. It grows on an epiphytic subshrub environment and is a herb. It grows on wet tropical biomes.

== Conservation ==
This species is assessed as Threatened, in a preliminary report.
