= Neuburgia collina =

Conservation status
- Least Concern (IUCN 2.3)

Scientific classification
- Kingdom: Plantae
- Clade: Tracheophytes
- Clade: Angiosperms
- Clade: Eudicots
- Clade: Asterids
- Order: Gentianales
- Family: Loganiaceae
- Genus: Neuburgia
- Species: N. collina

Binomial name
- Neuburgia collina (A.C.Sm) A.C.Smith

Species of plant

Neuburgia collina is a species of plant in the Loganiaceae family. It is endemic to Fiji.
