= Hedstromia =

Scientific classification
- Kingdom: Plantae
- Clade: Tracheophytes
- Clade: Angiosperms
- Clade: Eudicots
- Clade: Asterids
- Order: Gentianales
- Family: Rubiaceae
- Genus: Hedstromia; A.C.Sm.
- Species: H. latifolia

Binomial name
- Hedstromia latifolia A.C.Sm.

Genus of plants

Hedstromia is a monotypic genus of flowering plants belonging to the family Rubiaceae. It only contains one species, Hedstromia latifolia.

It is native to Fiji.

The genus name of Hedstromia honours John Maynard Hedstrom (1872–1951), a Fijian businessman and politician. The Latin specific epithet of latifolia means broad-leaved, it is derived from latus meaning broad. It was first described and published in Bull. Bernice P. Bishop Mus. vol.141 on page 148 in 1936.
