= Cyphosperma trichospadix =

Conservation status
- Vulnerable (IUCN 3.1)

Scientific classification
- Kingdom: Plantae
- Clade: Tracheophytes
- Clade: Angiosperms
- Clade: Monocots
- Clade: Commelinids
- Order: Arecales
- Family: Arecaceae
- Genus: Cyphosperma
- Species: C. trichospadix

Binomial name
- Cyphosperma trichospadix (Burret) H.E.Moore

Species of palm

Cyphosperma trichospadix (trichospadix being derived from the Greek words for "hair" and "spadix," an allusion to the hirsute spathe of the inflorescence) is a species of evergreen flowering plant in the family Arecaceae. It is endemic to Fiji, currently threatened by habitat loss, and thus extremely rare in cultivation.

== Habitat ==
This understory plant thrives in rainy, cloudy mountains and forests at elevations ranging from to 2,000 to 4,000 feet (610 to 1,220 m).

== Physical characteristics ==
A medium-size palm reaching approximately 23 feet (7.0 m) in height with 2-foot-long (0.61 m) leaflets. Its fruits are oval, no more than 2 cm long, and pale yellow when ripe.
