= Bulbophyllum samoanum =

Scientific classification
- Kingdom: Plantae
- Clade: Tracheophytes
- Clade: Angiosperms
- Clade: Monocots
- Order: Asparagales
- Family: Orchidaceae
- Subfamily: Epidendroideae
- Genus: Bulbophyllum
- Species: B. samoanum

Binomial name
- Bulbophyllum samoanum Schltr.

Species of plant

Bulbophyllum samoanum, also known as the Samoan bulbophyllum, is a species of orchid in the genus Bulbophyllum.

== Description ==
Unifoliate epiphyte. Blooms on a single flowered 12 cm long inflorescence

== Distribution ==
Bulbophyllum samoanum is native to Samoa, and also to Fiji, New Caledonia, and Vanuatu.

Occurrence

The plant is found at elevations of 300–900 metres (980–2,950 ft). It grows in areas of partial shade and high temperatures

== Uses ==
Bulbophyllum samoanum is cultivated as an ornamental plant.
