= Carex gibbsiae =

Scientific classification
- Kingdom: Plantae
- Clade: Tracheophytes
- Clade: Angiosperms
- Clade: Monocots
- Clade: Commelinids
- Order: Poales
- Family: Cyperaceae
- Genus: Carex
- Species: C. gibbsiae

Binomial name
- Carex gibbsiae Rendle

Synonyms
- Carex vitiensis H.St.John

Species of grass-like plant

Carex gibbsiae is a species of true sedge in the family Cyperaceae, native to Fiji. It is a tufted perennial which is found in upland forests of the main island, Viti Levu.
