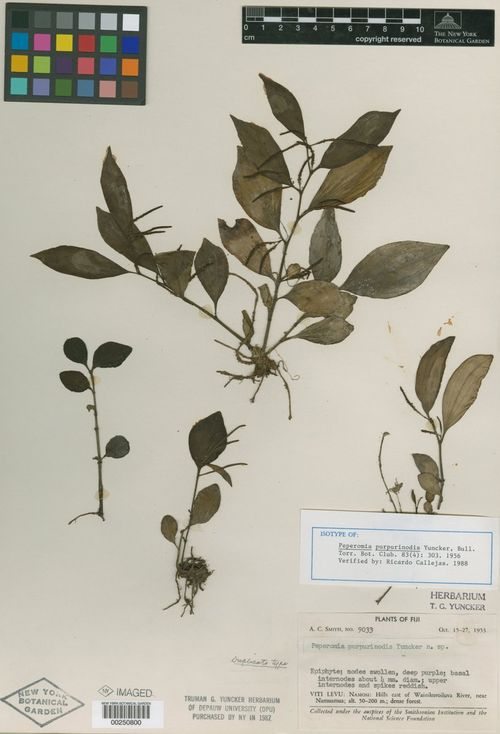

Scientific classification
- Kingdom: Plantae
- Clade: Embryophytes
- Clade: Tracheophytes
- Clade: Spermatophytes
- Clade: Angiosperms
- Clade: Magnoliids
- Order: Piperales
- Family: Piperaceae
- Genus: Peperomia
- Species: P. purpurinodis

Binomial name
- Peperomia purpurinodis Yunck.

= Peperomia purpurinodis =

Species of flowering plant

Peperomia purpurinodis is a species of subshrub in the genus Peperomia that is endemic in Fiji. It grows on wet tropical biomes. Its conservation status is Threatened.

== Description ==
The type specimen were collected near Namosi, Fiji.

Peperomia purpurinodis is a small, herbaceous epiphyte, growing up to 15 cm (5.9 in) tall and branching from the base. Its stems have swollen nodes that are a deep purple color, a distinctive feature noted in living plants. The stems and nodes are densely covered in very short (0.25 mm), stiff, erect hairs. The alternate leaves are elliptic to elliptic-subobovate, measuring 4–7 cm long and 1.5–3 cm wide. The leaf tip is attenuate and acute (though lower leaves may be more rounded), and the base is acute to wedge-shaped. Both leaf surfaces are hirtellous, and the blade is notably dotted with prominent orange-red glandular dots. The margins are ciliolate, at least toward the tip. The leaves are palmately 7–9-nerved and dry to a rather firm, subtransparent texture with a narrowly revolute margin. The petiole is about 5 mm long and hirtellous. The spikes are 2–5 cm long, either solitary or arranged in small, paniculate clusters of 2 or 3 in the leaf axils. The peduncle is 3–5 mm long and slightly hirtellous, and both the peduncle and the rachis are dotted with glands. The floral bracts are round-peltate, and the drupes are about 0.75 mm long, turbinate to subglobose, with an apical stigma.

This species is set apart by its small stature, distinctly swollen purple nodes, and leaves that are palmately 7–9-nerved and covered in prominent orange-red glandular dots. While its dense, short indument resembles that of P. parhamii, it differs markedly in the size, shape, and higher nerve count of its leaves.

== Taxonomy and naming ==
It was described in 1956 by Truman G. Yuncker in Bulletin of the Torrey Botanical Club 83, from specimens collected by Albert Charles Smith. It got its name from description of the species.

== Distribution and habitat ==
It is endemic in Fiji. It grows on an epiphytic subshrub environment and is a herb. It grows on wet tropical biomes.

== Conservation ==
This species is assessed as Threatened, in a preliminary report.
