= Heterospathe longipes =

Conservation status
- Endangered (IUCN 3.1)

Scientific classification
- Kingdom: Plantae
- Clade: Tracheophytes
- Clade: Angiosperms
- Clade: Monocots
- Clade: Commelinids
- Order: Arecales
- Family: Arecaceae
- Genus: Heterospathe
- Species: H. longipes

Binomial name
- Heterospathe longipes (H.E.Moore) Norup

Synonyms
- Homotypic Synonyms: Alsmithia longipes H.E.Moore

Species of palm

Heterospathe longipes is a species of flowering plant in the palm family, Arecaceae. It can reach 10 meters in height.

== Distribution and habitat ==
It is endemic to Fiji. It has been observed growing on slopes in the understory or edge of moist forests, at elevations between 100 and 600 meters.

== Reproductive biology ==
It has been reported to be dispersed by bats.

== Taxonomy ==
This species was moved to genus Heterospathe from the monotypic Alsmithia in 2005.
