= Spiraeanthemum graeffei =

Conservation status
- Least Concern (IUCN 3.1)

Scientific classification
- Kingdom: Plantae
- Clade: Tracheophytes
- Clade: Angiosperms
- Clade: Eudicots
- Clade: Rosids
- Order: Oxalidales
- Family: Cunoniaceae
- Genus: Spiraeanthemum
- Species: S. graeffei

Binomial name
- Spiraeanthemum graeffei Seem.

Species of flowering plant

Spiraeanthemum graeffei is a species of flowering plant in the family Cunoniaceae. It is a shrub or tree endemic to the island of Viti Levu in Fiji. It grows 3 to 8 metres tall, and is common in dense moist forest and forest edges from 275 to 1,050 metres elevation.

The species was described by Berthold Carl Seemann in 1866.
