= Bulbophyllum falcifolium =

Scientific classification
- Kingdom: Plantae
- Clade: Tracheophytes
- Clade: Angiosperms
- Clade: Monocots
- Order: Asparagales
- Family: Orchidaceae
- Subfamily: Epidendroideae
- Genus: Bulbophyllum
- Species: B. falcifolium

Binomial name
- Bulbophyllum falcifolium Schltr.

Species of orchid

Bulbophyllum falcifolium is a species of orchid in the genus Bulbophyllum.
