= Spiraeanthemum serratum =

Conservation status
- Least Concern (IUCN 3.1)

Scientific classification
- Kingdom: Plantae
- Clade: Tracheophytes
- Clade: Angiosperms
- Clade: Eudicots
- Clade: Rosids
- Order: Oxalidales
- Family: Cunoniaceae
- Genus: Spiraeanthemum
- Species: S. serratum

Binomial name
- Spiraeanthemum serratum Gillespie

Species of flowering plant

Spiraeanthemum serratum is a species of flowering plant in the family Cunoniaceae. It is a shrub or tree endemic to Fiji, where it is native to the islands of Viti Levu and Taveuni. It grows 3 to 5 metres tall in dense thickets on mountain crests and ridges from 1,100 to 1,323 metres elevation.
