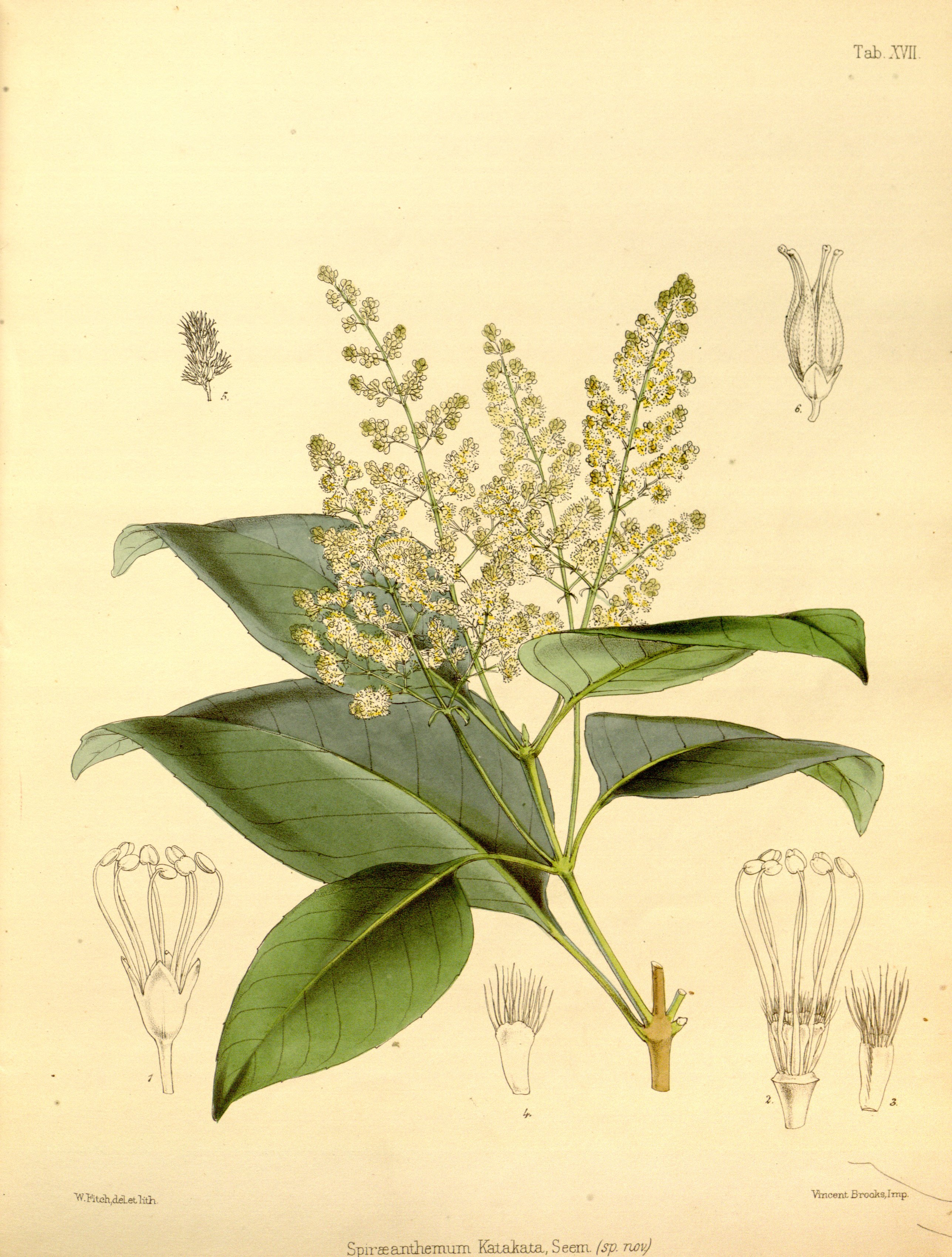

Conservation status
- Least Concern (IUCN 3.1)

Scientific classification
- Kingdom: Plantae
- Clade: Tracheophytes
- Clade: Angiosperms
- Clade: Eudicots
- Clade: Rosids
- Order: Oxalidales
- Family: Cunoniaceae
- Genus: Spiraeanthemum
- Species: S. katakata

Binomial name
- Spiraeanthemum katakata Seem.

Synonyms
- Spiraeanthemum parksii Gillespie

= Spiraeanthemum katakata =

Species of flowering plant

Spiraeanthemum katakata is a species of flowering plant in the family Cunoniaceae. It is a tree endemic to Fiji. It typically grows as a tree, and sometimes as a gnarled shrub, from 3 to 15 metres tall. It is present on the islands of Viti Levu, Ovalau, Vanua Levu, and possibly Kadavu, where it grows in dense moist forest, dry forest, ridgetop forest and thicket, and forest-grassland transition from 100 to 1,195 metres elevation.

The species was described by Berthold Carl Seemann in 1866.
