= Neuburgia alata =

Conservation status
- Endangered (IUCN 3.1)

Scientific classification
- Kingdom: Plantae
- Clade: Tracheophytes
- Clade: Angiosperms
- Clade: Eudicots
- Clade: Asterids
- Order: Gentianales
- Family: Loganiaceae
- Genus: Neuburgia
- Species: N. alata

Binomial name
- Neuburgia alata (A.C.Sm.) A.C.Sm.

Synonyms
- Couthovia alata A.C.Sm.

Species of plant

Neuburgia alata is a species of flowering plant in the Loganiaceae family. It is a tree endemic to southeastern Viti Levu in Fiji.

The species was first described as Couthovia alata by Albert Charles Smith in 1942. In 1969 Smith placed the species in genus Neuburgia as N. alata.
