= Neuburgia macrocarpa =

Conservation status
- Data Deficient (IUCN 3.1)

Scientific classification
- Kingdom: Plantae
- Clade: Tracheophytes
- Clade: Angiosperms
- Clade: Eudicots
- Clade: Asterids
- Order: Gentianales
- Family: Loganiaceae
- Genus: Neuburgia
- Species: N. macrocarpa

Binomial name
- Neuburgia macrocarpa (A.C.Sm.) A.C.Sm.

Synonyms
- Couthovia macrocarpa A.C.Sm.; Couthovia pachyantha A.C.Sm.; Neuburgia pachyantha (A.C.Sm.) A.C.Sm.

Species of plant

Neuburgia macrocarpa is a species of flowering plant in the Loganiaceae family. It is a tree endemic to Viti Levu and Vanua Levu in Fiji.

The species was first described as Couthovia macrocarpa by Albert Charles Smith in 1942. In 1969 Smith placed the species in genus Neuburgia as N. macrocarpa.
