= Bulbophyllum chimaera =

Scientific classification
- Kingdom: Plantae
- Clade: Tracheophytes
- Clade: Angiosperms
- Clade: Monocots
- Order: Asparagales
- Family: Orchidaceae
- Subfamily: Epidendroideae
- Genus: Bulbophyllum
- Species: B. chimaera

Binomial name
- Bulbophyllum chimaera Schltr.

Species of orchid

Bulbophyllum chimaera is a species of orchid in the genus Bulbophyllum.

It was identified by Schltr. in 1913. The species grows within montane forests at an approximate elevation 1,000 metres (3,300 ft) on tree trunks devoid of moss, in Papua and New Guinea.

The genus Bulbophyllum contains around 2000 species distributed across the warmer continents. It was first described by Louis-Marie Aubert du Petit-Thouars
