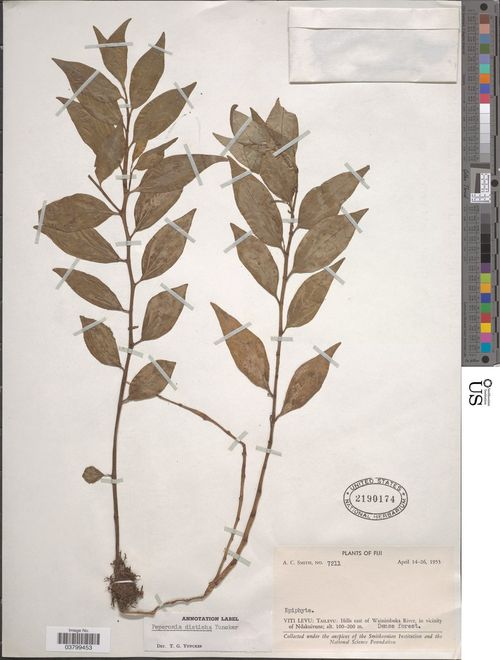

Scientific classification
- Kingdom: Plantae
- Clade: Embryophytes
- Clade: Tracheophytes
- Clade: Spermatophytes
- Clade: Angiosperms
- Clade: Magnoliids
- Order: Piperales
- Family: Piperaceae
- Genus: Peperomia
- Species: P. disticha

Binomial name
- Peperomia disticha Yunck.

= Peperomia disticha =

Species of plant endemic to Fiji

Peperomia disticha is a species of subshrub in the genus Peperomia that is endemic in Fiji. It grows on wet tropical biomes. Its conservation status is Threatened.

== Description ==
The type specimen were collected near Tailevu, Fiji.

Peperomia disticha is an epiphytic herb that grows over 40 cm (16 in) tall, with stems branching from the base and reaching about 3 mm in thickness when dry. The stems are densely covered in crisp, curly hairs less than 0.25 mm long. Its leaves are arranged alternately in two distinct rows (distichous) and are elliptic to elliptic-lanceolate in shape, measuring 4–6 cm (1.6–2.4 in) long and 1.5–2.5 cm (0.6–1.0 in) wide. Each leaf features a long-acuminate, slightly sickle-shaped tip and an acute base. The upper and lower surfaces are pubescent, with fine hairs along the ciliolate edges. The leaves are palmately 5-nerved, with translucent tissue and no glandular dots. Petioles are up to 5 mm long. The inflorescence consists of small spikes 1–1.5 cm (0.4–0.6 in) long and about 1 mm in diameter, borne in axillary panicle-like clusters of 3–5 spikes. The floral bracts are round-peltate, and the drupes are turbinate to subglobose, roughly 0.75 mm long, with an apical stigma.

This species is distinguished by its crisp pubescence, two-ranked leaf arrangement, and notably short spikes. It bears some resemblance to Peperomia lasiostigma, but differs in its hair type and generally shorter spikes.

== Taxonomy and naming ==
It was described in 1956 by Truman G. Yuncker in Bulletin of the Torrey Botanical Club 83, from specimens collected by Albert Charles Smith. It got its name from description of the species.

== Distribution and habitat ==
It is endemic in Fiji. It grows on an epiphytic subshrub environment and is a herb. It grows on wet tropical biomes.

== Conservation ==
This species is assessed as Threatened, in a preliminary report.
