= Cyphosperma tanga =

Conservation status
- Critically Endangered (IUCN 3.1)

Scientific classification
- Kingdom: Plantae
- Clade: Tracheophytes
- Clade: Angiosperms
- Clade: Monocots
- Clade: Commelinids
- Order: Arecales
- Family: Arecaceae
- Genus: Cyphosperma
- Species: C. tanga

Binomial name
- Cyphosperma tanga (H.E. Moore) H.E.Moore

Synonyms
- Taveunia tanga H.E.Moore

Species of palm

Cyphosperma tanga is a species of flowering plant in the family Arecaceae. It is a tree endemic to Fiji, known only from Mount Tomanivi on Viti Levu. Cutting by the Forestry Department resulted in the serious depletion of one subpopulation in 1970 and also continues to affect another more recently discovered subpopulation. Seed crops of reasonable size appear to be extremely infrequent and it is threatened by habitat loss.

The species was first described as Taveunia tanga by H.E.Moore in 1965. In 1977 Moore placed the species in genus Cyphosperma as C. tanga.
