= Syzygium dubium =

Conservation status
- Data Deficient (IUCN 3.1)

Scientific classification
- Kingdom: Plantae
- Clade: Tracheophytes
- Clade: Angiosperms
- Clade: Eudicots
- Clade: Rosids
- Order: Myrtales
- Family: Myrtaceae
- Genus: Syzygium
- Species: S. dubium

Binomial name
- Syzygium dubium (L.M.Perry) A.C.Sm. (1985)

Synonyms
- Syzygium brackenridgei var. dubium L.M.Perry (1950)

Species of flowering plant

Syzygium dubium is a species of flowering plant in the myrtle family, Myrtaceae. It is a tree endemic to the island of Vanua Levu in Fiji, where it is known from the Wainunu catchment.

Little is known about the species, and there are few collections and observations. Its conservation status is assessed as Data Deficient.
