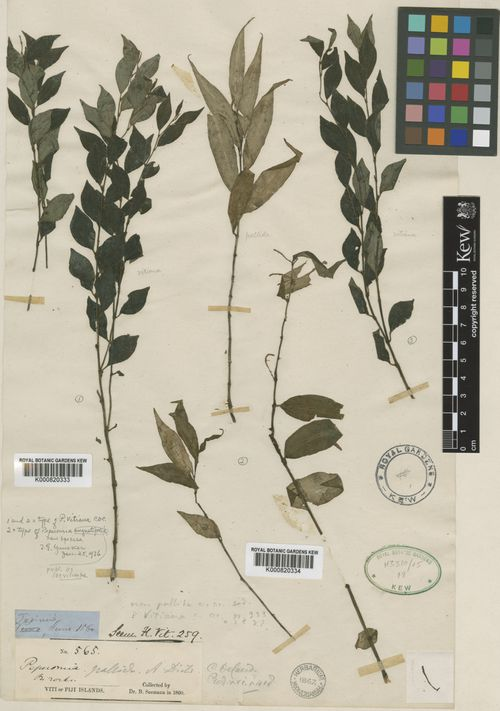

Scientific classification
- Kingdom: Plantae
- Clade: Tracheophytes
- Clade: Angiosperms
- Clade: Magnoliids
- Order: Piperales
- Family: Piperaceae
- Genus: Peperomia
- Species: P. vitiana

Binomial name
- Peperomia vitiana C.DC.

Synonyms
- Peperomia pallida Seem.

= Peperomia vitiana =

Species of epiphytic subshrub

Peperomia vitiana is a species of epiphytic subshrub from the genus, Peperomia. It grows in wet tropical biomes. It was first described by Casimir de Candolle and published in the book "Prodromus Systematis Naturalis Regni Vegetabilis 16(1): 458. 1869".

== Description ==
The lower leaves are alternate, they are long petiolate and opposite to the upper smaller ones. It is 5-veined, with a pubescent petiole, terminal axillary catkins, filiform dense leaves are slightly surpassing the maturity of sublaxi-pedunculated pubescent flowers, a rounded bract in the center, peltate with a very short petiolate. Limbs are 0.04 long, Petioles are 0.01 long, and Peduncles are 0.015 long.

== Distribution ==
Peperomia vitiana is native to Fiji and New Caledonia.
