= Syzygium purpureum =

Conservation status
- Least Concern (IUCN 3.1)

Scientific classification
- Kingdom: Plantae
- Clade: Tracheophytes
- Clade: Angiosperms
- Clade: Eudicots
- Clade: Rosids
- Order: Myrtales
- Family: Myrtaceae
- Genus: Syzygium
- Species: S. purpureum

Binomial name
- Syzygium purpureum (L.M.Perry) A.C.Sm.

Synonyms
- Syzygium diffusum var. purpureum L.M.Perry

Species of flowering plant

Syzygium purpureum is a species of flowering plant in the family Myrtaceae. It is a tree endemic to Fiji. It grows 2 to 25 metres high in dense tropical moist forest or in forest patches in open countryside up to 1,200 metres elevation.

It was first described as Syzygium diffusum var. purpureum by Lily May Perry in 1950. In the same year Albert Charles Smith described it as distinct species, S. purpureum.
