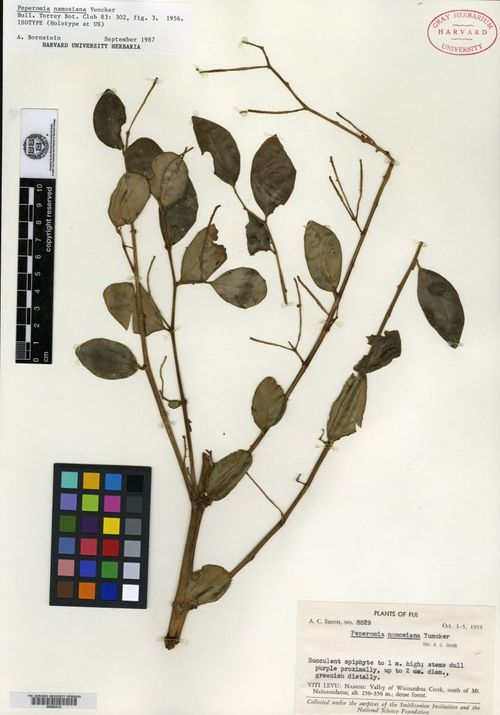

Scientific classification
- Kingdom: Plantae
- Clade: Embryophytes
- Clade: Tracheophytes
- Clade: Spermatophytes
- Clade: Angiosperms
- Clade: Magnoliids
- Order: Piperales
- Family: Piperaceae
- Genus: Peperomia
- Species: P. namosiana

Binomial name
- Peperomia namosiana Yunck.

= Peperomia namosiana =

Species of plant endemic to Fiji

Peperomia namosiana is a species of subshrub in the genus Peperomia that is endemic in Fiji. It grows on wet tropical biomes. Its conservation status is Threatened.

== Description ==
The type specimen were collected near Namosi, Fiji.

Peperomia namosiana is a rather large, succulent, epiphytic herb, reaching up to 1 m (3 ft 3 in) in height. Its stems, which can be up to 2 cm (0.8 in) thick and purplish near the base, branch toward the top and are densely covered in very short, stiffly erect hairs (hirtellous), scarcely 0.25 mm long. The alternate leaves are elliptical, measuring 3.5–5.5 cm (1.4–2.2 in) long and 1.5–3 cm (0.6–1.2 in) wide, with a rounded or bluntly pointed tip and an acute base. The undersides are moderately to densely pubescent with erect hairs about 0.5 mm long, while the upper surface has hairs only along the midrib. The leaf margins are densely ciliate. The leaves are palmately 5-nerved, with slender nerves that branch and anastomose, and feature a slender submarginal vein. They dry to a membranous, translucent texture. The petiole is very short, scarcely 5 mm long, and densely hirtellous. The inflorescences are axillary, paniculate clusters, typically of 3–5 spikes. Each spike is 2–3 cm (0.8–1.2 in) long and about 1 mm in diameter, with a densely hirtellous peduncle about 5 mm long. The floral bracts are round-peltate, and the drupes are turbinate to subglobose, about 0.8 mm long, with an apical stigma.

This species is distinguished from its close relative, P. parhamii, by its larger overall size, its obtuse and densely ciliated leaves, and the absence of glandular dots on the leaves. It also bears a resemblance to P. ciliifolia in leaf size and shape, but differs in its more robust, strongly branched habit, the character of its indument, and the lack of dark glandular dots on its leaves.

== Taxonomy and naming ==
It was described in 1956 by Truman G. Yuncker in Bulletin of the Torrey Botanical Club 83, from specimens collected by Albert Charles Smith. It got its name from location where the type specimen was collected.

== Distribution and habitat ==
It is endemic in Fiji. It grows on an epiphytic subshrub environment and is a herb. It grows on wet tropical biomes.

== Conservation ==
This species is assessed as Threatened, in a preliminary report.
