= Syzygium diffusum =

Conservation status
- Least Concern (IUCN 3.1)

Scientific classification
- Kingdom: Plantae
- Clade: Tracheophytes
- Clade: Angiosperms
- Clade: Eudicots
- Clade: Rosids
- Order: Myrtales
- Family: Myrtaceae
- Genus: Syzygium
- Species: S. diffusum

Binomial name
- Syzygium diffusum (Turrill) Merr. & L.M.Perry

Synonyms
- Eugenia diffusa Turrill

Species of flowering plant

Syzygium diffusum is a species of flowering plant in the family Myrtaceae. It is a tree endemic to Fiji. It grows up to 20 metres tall in lowland and montane tropical moist forests up to 1,200 metres elevation.

The species was first described as Eugenia diffusa by William Bertram Turrill in 1915. In 1942 Elmer Drew Merrill and Lily May Perry placed the species in genus Syzygium as S. diffusum.
