= Syzygium phaeophyllum =

Conservation status
- Least Concern (IUCN 3.1)

Scientific classification
- Kingdom: Plantae
- Clade: Tracheophytes
- Clade: Angiosperms
- Clade: Eudicots
- Clade: Rosids
- Order: Myrtales
- Family: Myrtaceae
- Genus: Syzygium
- Species: S. phaeophyllum

Binomial name
- Syzygium phaeophyllum Merr. & L.M.Perry

Synonyms
- Eugenia durifolia A.C.Sm.; Syzygium durifolium (A.C.Sm.) Merr. & L.M.Perry, nom. illeg. homonym. post.

Species of flowering plant

Syzygium phaeophyllum is a species of plant in the family Myrtaceae. It is a tree endemic to the island of Taveuni in Fiji. It is a small tree, up to six metres tall, which grows in tropical moist forest from 700 to 900 metres elevation. The species is known only from the type collection in 1936, and little is known about its present population. It grows in an area of no development and there are no known major threats to the species. The IUCN Red List assesses the species as Least Concern.
