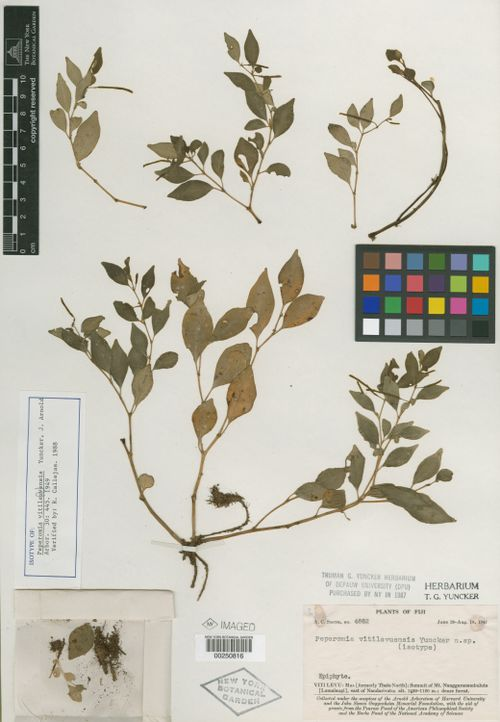

Scientific classification
- Kingdom: Plantae
- Clade: Tracheophytes
- Clade: Angiosperms
- Clade: Magnoliids
- Order: Piperales
- Family: Piperaceae
- Genus: Peperomia
- Species: P. vitilevuensis

Binomial name
- Peperomia vitilevuensis Yunck.

= Peperomia vitilevuensis =

Species of epiphytic subshrub

Peperomia vitilevuensis is a species of epiphyte from the genus Peperomia. It was first described by Truman G. Yuncker and published in the book "Journal of the Arnold Arboretum 30(4): 445. 1949. (J. Arnold Arbor.)". The etymology came from Viti Levu, the place where the species was discovered.

== Distribution ==
It is endemic to Fiji.

- Fiji
  - Mount Victoria
  - Mount Nanggaranambuluta

== Description ==
Stem up to 15 cm tall, branching sub-erect, 2 mm thick at the base when dry, densely hirtellous, with internodes generally 10-15 mm long; leaves alternating, elliptic, mostly 1.2-1.8 cm. Wide, 1.5-4 cm. long, the apex bluntly acute, the base acute, puberulent on both sides, ciliolate, palmately 3-5 nerved, the nerves branched upward, moderately dark-glandular dotted, drying membranous, translucent; petiole about 5 mm. long, hirtellous; spikes leaf-opposed, 1 mm. think and 15-20 mm. long, moderately to loose flowered; peduncle slender, 3-5 mm. long, hirtellous; rachis glabrous; bracts round peltate; drupe globos

From Peperomia subroseispica, they differ because of its densely hirtellous stems.
