= Carex albert-smithii =

Scientific classification
- Kingdom: Plantae
- Clade: Embryophytes
- Clade: Tracheophytes
- Clade: Angiosperms
- Clade: Monocots
- Clade: Commelinids
- Order: Poales
- Family: Cyperaceae
- Genus: Carex
- Species: C. albert-smithii

Binomial name
- Carex albert-smithii T.Koyama

Species of grass-like plant

Carex albert-smithii is a sedge of the Cyperaceae family that is native to Fiji.

== See also ==
- List of Carex species
