= Trade unions in Fiji =

- National organization(s): FTUC; NFU
- Total union membership: 30,000

Global Rights Index
- 4 Systematic violations of rights

International Labour Organization
- Fiji is a member of the ILO

Convention ratification
- Freedom of Association: 2002
- Right to Organise: 1974

Trade unions in Fiji have been shaped by racialised divisions dating from the British colonial era and severe instability caused by frequent coups d'état.

== Repression ==
The International Trade Union Confederation gave Fiji a score of 4 in its Global Rights Index, indicating systematic violations of trade union rights. Fiji shared this rating with 38 other countries.

== History ==
Fiji was a British colony until its independence in 1970. Racial divisions exist between the Indigenous (Melanesian-Polynesians), Indo-Fijians and European populations. Indo-Fijians are descendants of labourers brought from British India in the 19th century to cultivate sugar cane.

Trade union activity expanded along racial lines following the Industrial Associations Ordinance of 1942. Racialised trade unions declined in the 1960s while the Fiji Trade Union Congress (FTUC) rose to prominence. Its membership was predominantly Indo-Fijian, but its leadership was multiracial, including both Indo-Fijian and Indigenous leaders.

Following Fiji's independence in 1970, the Fiji Labour Party formed in 1985, with close links to the FTUC. After the 1987 coup, trade union rights were severely curtailed, provoking protests from Australian and New Zealand trade unions. Ethnicity based trade unions were re-established and the FTUC experienced repression, including arson attacks on its office and the imprisonment of its leaders.

The 1997 constitution restored trade union rights and ended legalised discrimination against Indo-Fijians. Mahendra Chaudhry, then leader of the Fiji Public Service Association and a former FTUC secretary, was elected as prime minister in 1999 as leader of the Fiji Labour Party. He was deposed in the 2000 coup. He was re-elected to parliament in the 2006 elections, but infighting between Chaudhry and Felix Anthony led to a split between the Labour Party and the FTUC respectively. Chaudhry remained leader of the National Farmers Union of Fiji and the Labour Party, while Anthony remained leader of the FTUC. In 2013, Anthony formed the People's Democratic Party and affiliated FTUC to it.

Following the coup in 2000, nine of the 35 existing unions broke away from FTUC to form the Fiji Islands Council of Trade Unions (FICTU). By 2018, all 16 FICTU affiliates had merged back into the FTUC.

The military took over the sugar cane industry in 2009. By 2013, it had nullified all collective agreements, outlawed strikes and arrested trade union leaders. The International Labour Organization was expelled. Union density declined from 45% to 35%. In 2015, FTUC leader signed a tripartite agreement with the state and the Fiji Commerce and Employers Federation, restoring labour laws from the 2007 era. Frequent labour rights violations and harassment of trade union officials continue.

== Trade unions ==
- Fiji Trades Union Congress
  - Fiji Public Service Association affiliated to PSI, ITF
  - Fiji Sugar & General Workers Union affiliated to IUF
  - Fijian Teachers Association affiliated to Education International
  - Fiji Teachers Union affiliated to Education International
  - National Union of Factory and Commercial Workers Union affiliated to IndustriALL, UNI
  - National Union of Hospitality, Catering Tourism Industries Employees affiliated to IUF, ITF
  - National Union of Workers affiliated to IUF
- National Farmers Union of Fiji - represents workers of Fiji Sugar Corporation
