= Sugar mills in Fiji =

Sugar cane grew wild in Fiji and was used as thatch by the Fijians for their houses (bures). The first attempt to make sugar in Fiji was on Wakaya Island in 1862 but this was a financial failure. With the cotton boom of the 1860s there was little incentive to plant a crop that required high capital outlay but after a slump in cotton prices in 1870, the planters turned to sugar. In an effort to promote the production of sugar in Fiji, the Cakobau Government, in December 1871, offered a 500-pound reward for the first and best crop of twenty of sugar from canes planted before January 1873.

== History ==
The first cane sugar mill in Fiji was built in 1872 by Brewster and Joske near to the present site of the Government Buildings in the capital city of Suva. By the end of 1874, there were four mills in operation, six by the end of 1875 and ten by the end of 1878. Most of these mills crushed for only a few years and only a few survived the crash in sugar price of 1884. The surviving mills were Navua Sugar Mill, Panang Mill, Holmshurst (Taveuni) and the Rewa Sugar Company (Koronivia).

The arrival of the Colonial Sugar Refining Company led to the establishment of Commercially viable sugar mills. In 1880, John Bates Thurston went to Australia seeking investment for Fiji and persuaded the Colonial Sugar Refining Company (CSR) to extend its operations to Fiji. The first mill built by the CSR was the Nausori Sugar Mill on the banks of the Rewa River and began crushing in the 1882 crushing season. In 1883, construction began for its second mill in Ba, the Rarawai Mill. Another mill was built at Viria, also on the Rewa River, and crushed from 1886 to 1895. It was closed because it was too small to be viable. In 1890, the Labasa Mill was erected from a dismantled mill in Queensland.

By 1926 all other sugar mills had closed down and the CSR owned the five existing mills in Fiji of which Nausori mill closed down in 1959.

== List of sugar mills ==
- Suva Sugar Mill - 1872 to 1875
- Selia Levu Estate (Taveuni) - 1874 to 1890
- Penang (Rakiraki) Sugar Mill - from 1878 to 2016.
- Nausori Sugar Mill - 1882 to 1959
- Rarawai (Ba) Sugar Mill - from 1886
- Tamanua (Navua) Sugar Mill - 1884 to 1923
- Koronivia Sugar Mill - from 1884 (a mill was moved to this location by the Rewa Sugar Co. Ltd, previously known as Rewa Plantation Co. Ltd)
- Holmshurst (Taveuni) Sugar Mill - 1882 to 1896
- Viria Sugar Mill - 1886 to 1895
- Labasa Sugar Mill - from 1894
- Lautoka Sugar Mill - from 1903
- Namara Sugar Mill - from 2015
- Matanisivana Sugar Mill - from 1992

== List of sugar cane railways ==
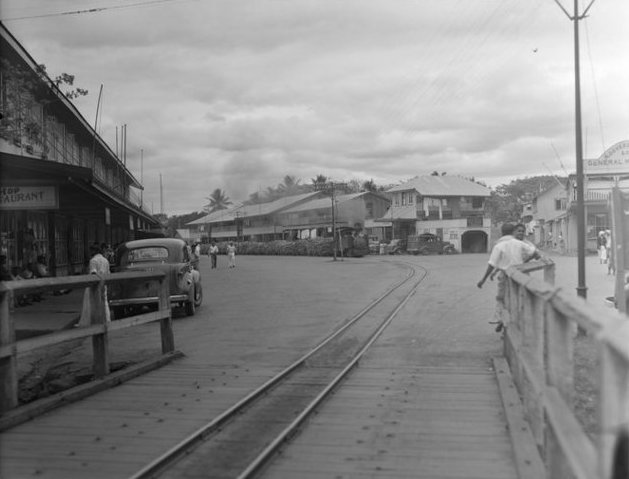
Sugar cane train on a railway track on the road in Ba, 1949

- Labasa Mill Tramway, 1894 to 1982
- Rarawai–Kavanagasau Light Railway, from 1914

== Bibliography ==
- Gillion, K. L. (1962). Fiji's Indian Migrants: A history to the end of indenture in 1920. London: Oxford University Press. pp. 69–79.

== See also ==
- Rail transport in Fiji (the cane trains)
- Trapiche
