= NAVO =

NAVO or Navo may refer to:

- Naval Oceanographic Office
- Arbeidsgiverforeningen NAVO
- Navo, Texas, a small unincorporated community in Denton County, Texas, USA
- Navo (Fiji), a station of the Rarawai–Kavanagasau Light Railway
- NAVO RK-P4/220, Dutch aircraft
