= Rail transport in Fiji =

Rail transport in Fiji moves cut sugar cane to crushing mills. Also, there used to be two horse-drawn street tramway systems, some other passenger systems, an underground mine system, and some tramways on construction projects.

== Cane trains ==
Tramways have been used to transport sugar cane from the fields to the mill since 1876, when a 2.4 km (1.5 mi) horse tramway was constructed on the Selia Levu estate, on the island of Taveuni. The Holmhurst Mill on Tavenui had tramways from 1882 of 2 ft 6 in (762 mm) narrow gauge. A tramway was also built on Mago Island.

Most cane tramways were of 2 ft (610 mm) gauge, on the main islands of Viti Levu and Vanua Levu. Steam engines were used, later replaced with diesel locomotives. Most of the mills and tramways were built by the Colonial Sugar Refining Company (CSR), and were transferred to the Fiji Sugar Corporation in 1973, when CSR withdrew from Fiji.

Many lines were on road reserve provided by the government; combined road-rail bridges were common. Some passenger services were provided, such as the famous Free Train from 1915, with one or two trains a week from Lautoka to Kavanagasau and Rarawai on the Rarawai–Kavanagasau Light Railway.

In 1988, according to Cane Train, there was 645 km (401 mi) of permanent cane railway in Fiji, for the Lautoka and Rrawai, and Penang mills on Viti Levu, and the Labasa, on Vanua Levu. As of 2020 over 300 km is currently operating.

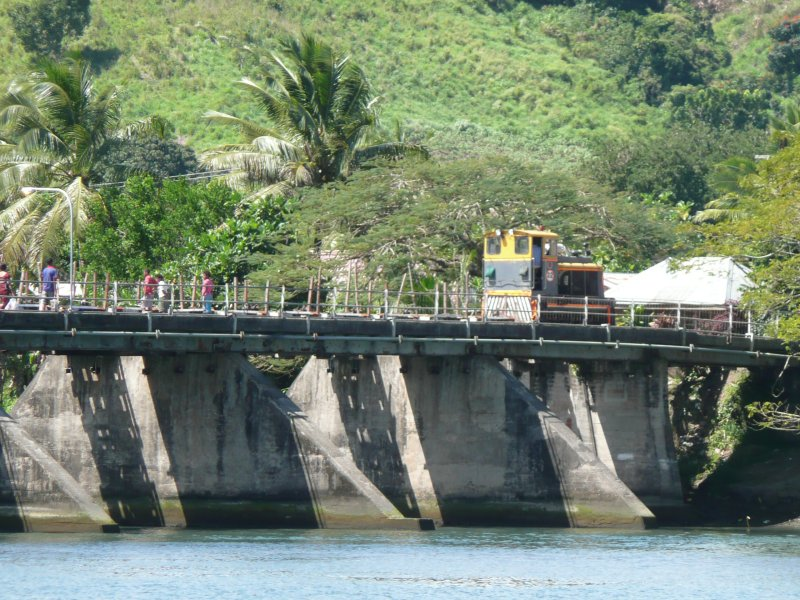
Locomotive no. 22 crossing Sigatoka bridge with a long train of empty wagons, near the end of the South Coast line.

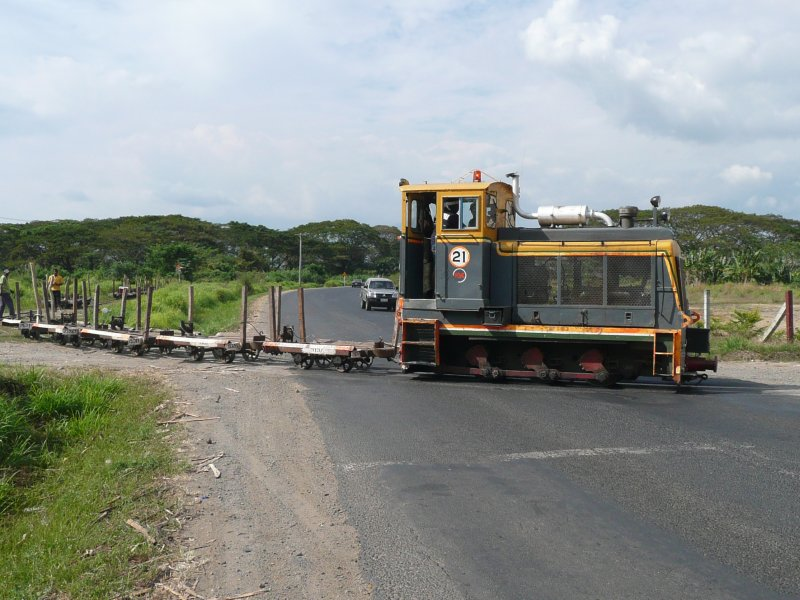
Locomotive no. 21 crossing Nadi Back Road into the cane fields with a few empty wagons. The main line runs parallel to the road on left.

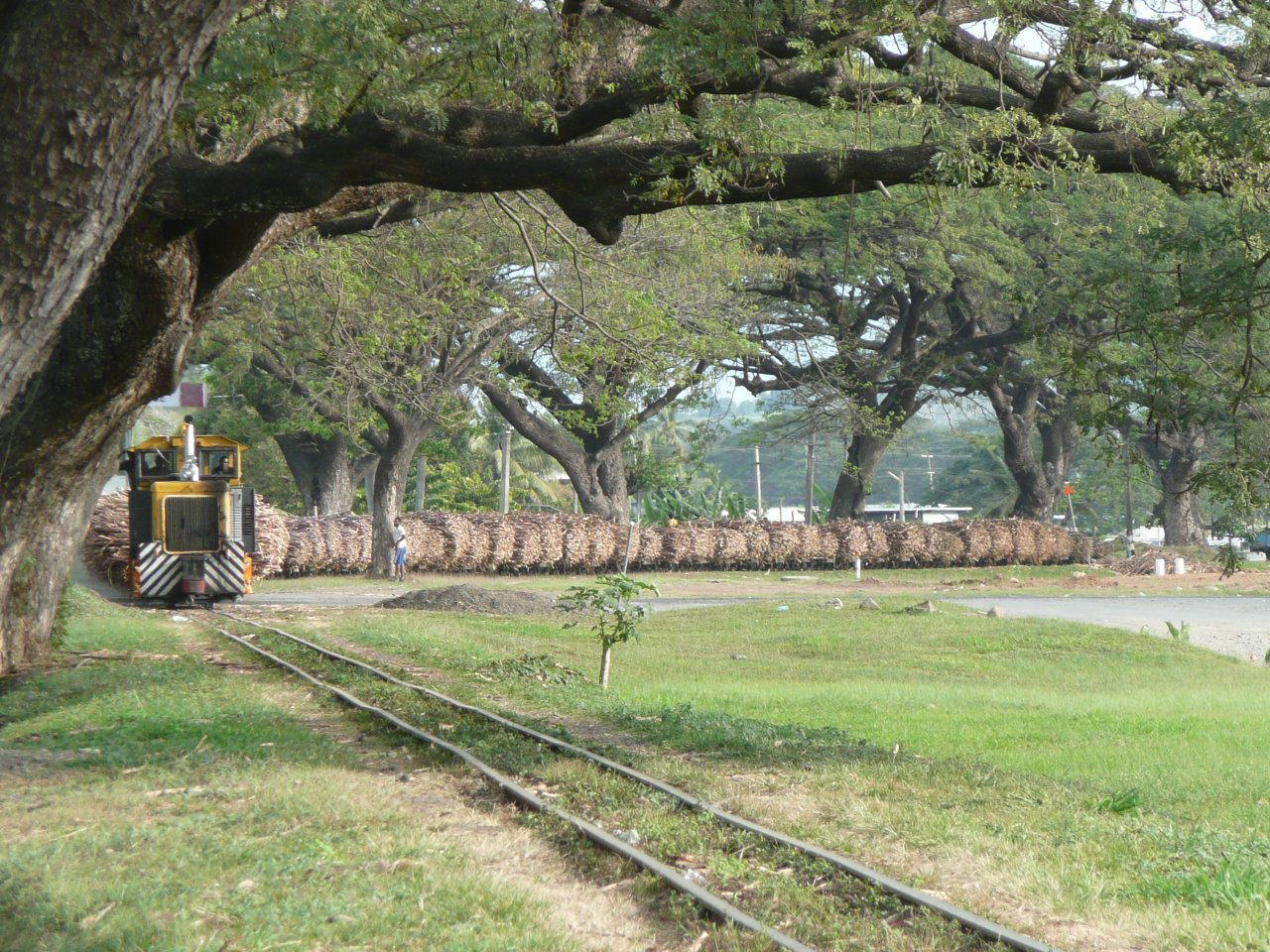
Locomotive no. 11 entering Lautoka with a long train of approximately 45 loaded wagons.

== Passenger lines ==
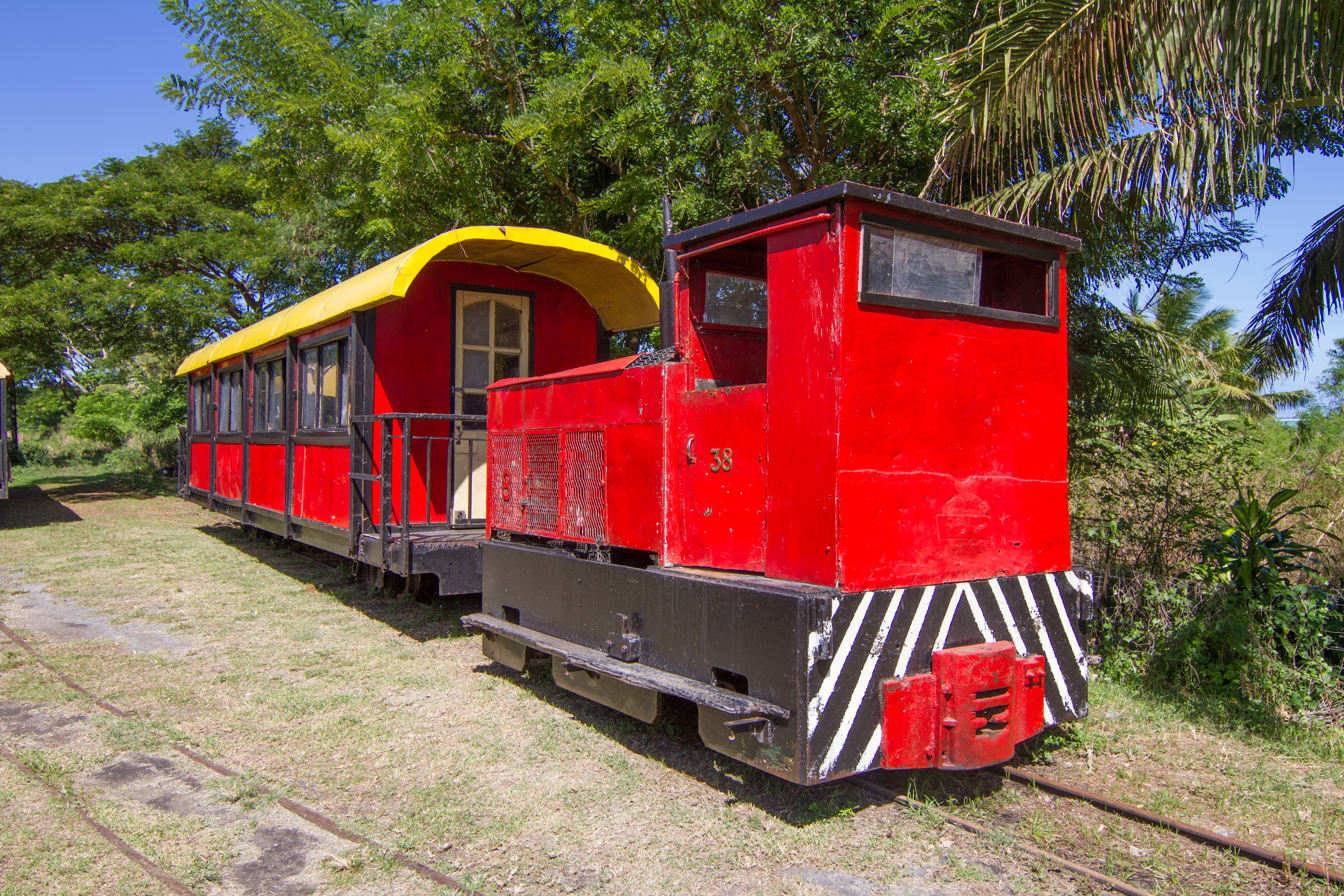
Coral Coast Railway

In the 1970s, a holiday resort on Malololailai Island, Nadi Bay, built a short tramway from the air strip to the resort complex, using 2 ft (610 mm) gauge equipment from the Fiji Sugar Corporation.

The Coral Coast Railway Company, on Viti Levu, has operated return trips for visitors from Yanuca Island to Natadola Beach (16 km or 9.9 mi towards Nadi) from 1986 and also to Sigatoka.

== Horse tramways ==
In 1884, the Levuka Tramway Company operated a 2 ft 6 in (762 mm) gauge tramway along the streets of Levuka to connect warehouses with the wharves. Similar tramways were laid in the new capital of Suva in the 1880s and were put on an official footing in 1891. Both were horse-operated, with the help of manpower.

== Mine railways ==
The Emperor Gold Mine, at Vatukoula, in northern Viti Levu, used 2 ft (610 mm) gauge tramways underground, with 21 battery-electric locomotives.

== Construction tramways ==
Tramways were built for reclamation at Suva and Lautoka, airfield construction at Nadi (1941–1942), tunnelling for the Suva sewerage system and for the 1980s Monasavu hydroelectric scheme in the centre of Viti Levu.

== See also ==
- Transport in Fiji
