= Transport in Fiji =

Modes of transport in Fiji include rail, road, water, and air. The rail network is mainly used for movement of sugar cane. Suva and Lautoka are the largest seaports. There are 122 km of navigable inland waterways. There are two international airports, one other paved airport, and over 20 with unpaved runways. With 333 tropical islands that make up this country, one can expect to use various modes of transport to get to their destination.

== Buses ==
Buses are the main mode of transport in Fiji's main islands.

== Railways ==
Total: 597 km; 597 km 0.610-m gauge (1995)

Narrow gauge: Note: belongs to the government-owned Fiji Sugar Corporation The railway is not for passenger or public use.

== Waterways ==
203 km; 122 km navigable by motorized craft and 200-metric-ton barges

=== Ports and harbors ===
Labasa, Lautoka, Levuka, Savusavu, Suva

=== Merchant marine ===
Total: 6 ships (1,000 GT or over) totaling 11,870 GT/14,787 tonnes deadweight (DWT) Ships by type: chemical tanker 2, passenger 1, petroleum tanker 1, roll-on/roll-off 1, specialized tanker 1 (1999 est.)

== Airports ==
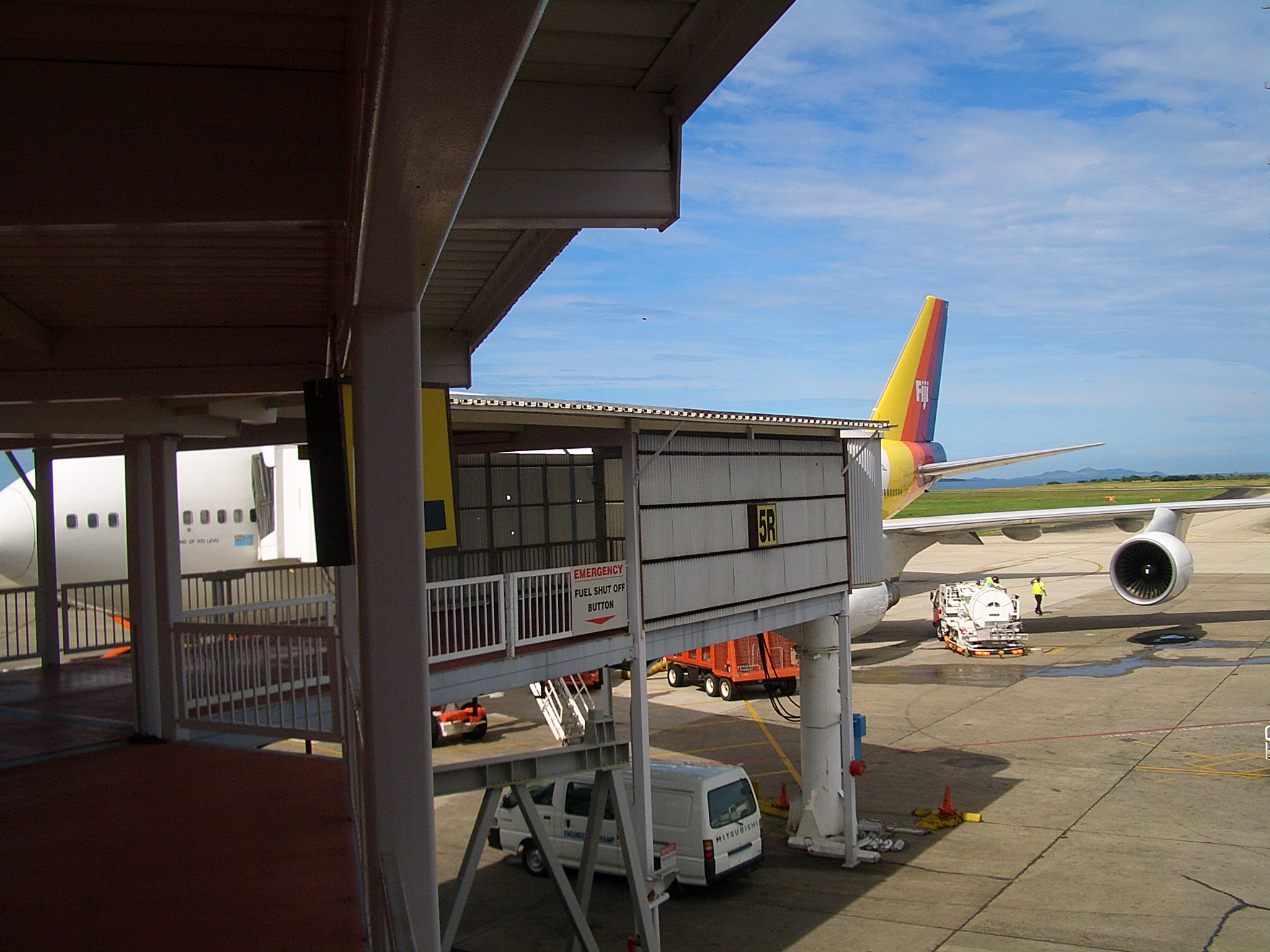
In Nadi International Airport

Fiji has two airports that cater to international air traffic, the main one being Nadi International Airport and a secondary one, Nausori Airport, which receives a small number of international flights. There are 13 other smaller domestic airports spread throughout the country's outer islands and these mainly cater for small prop aircraft. Airports Fiji Limited (AFL), a state-owned enterprise owns and operates Nadi International Airport and manages the other 14 airports for the Government.

Major airports include:

- Nadi International Airport
- Nausori International Airport

Total 25 (1999 est.)

=== Airports with paved runways ===
Total: 3 Over 3,047 m: 1 1,524 to 2,437 m: 1 914 to 1,523 m: 1 (1999 est.)

=== Airports with unpaved runways ===
Total: 22 914 to 1,523 m: 5 Under 914 m: 17 (1999 est.)

== Bibliography ==
- CIA World Factbook (c2002)
- Cane Train: The Sugar-cane Railways of Fiji by Peter Dyer & Peter Hodge (1988, New Zealand Railway & Locomotive Society, Wellington) ISBN 0-908573-50-2 a revision of:
- Balloon Stacks and Sugar Cane by Peter Dyer & Peter Hodge (1961, New Zealand Railway & Locomotive Society, Wellington)

== See also ==
- Public transport in Fiji
