= Sugarcane mill =

Factory that processes sugar cane to produce raw or white sugar

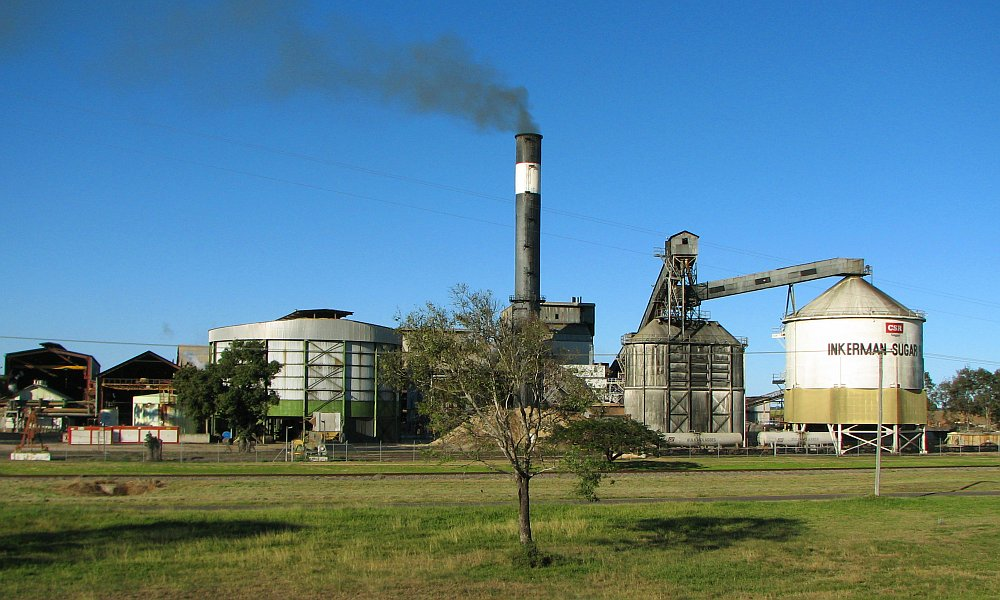
Inkerman sugar mill in Australia

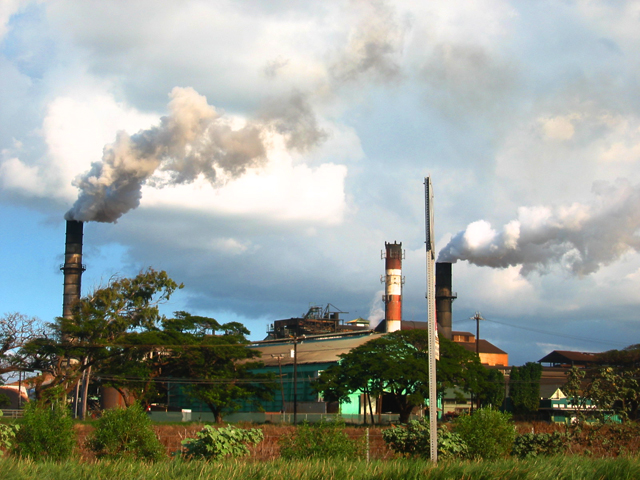
Hawaii Commercial Sugar (HC&S) sugar mill in Puʻunene, Hawaii.

A sugar cane mill is a factory that processes sugar cane to produce raw sugar or plantation white sugar. Some sugar mills are situated next to a back-end refinery, that turns raw sugar into (refined) white sugar.

The term is also used to refer to the equipment that crushes the sticks of sugar cane to extract the juice.

== Production of raw sugar ==
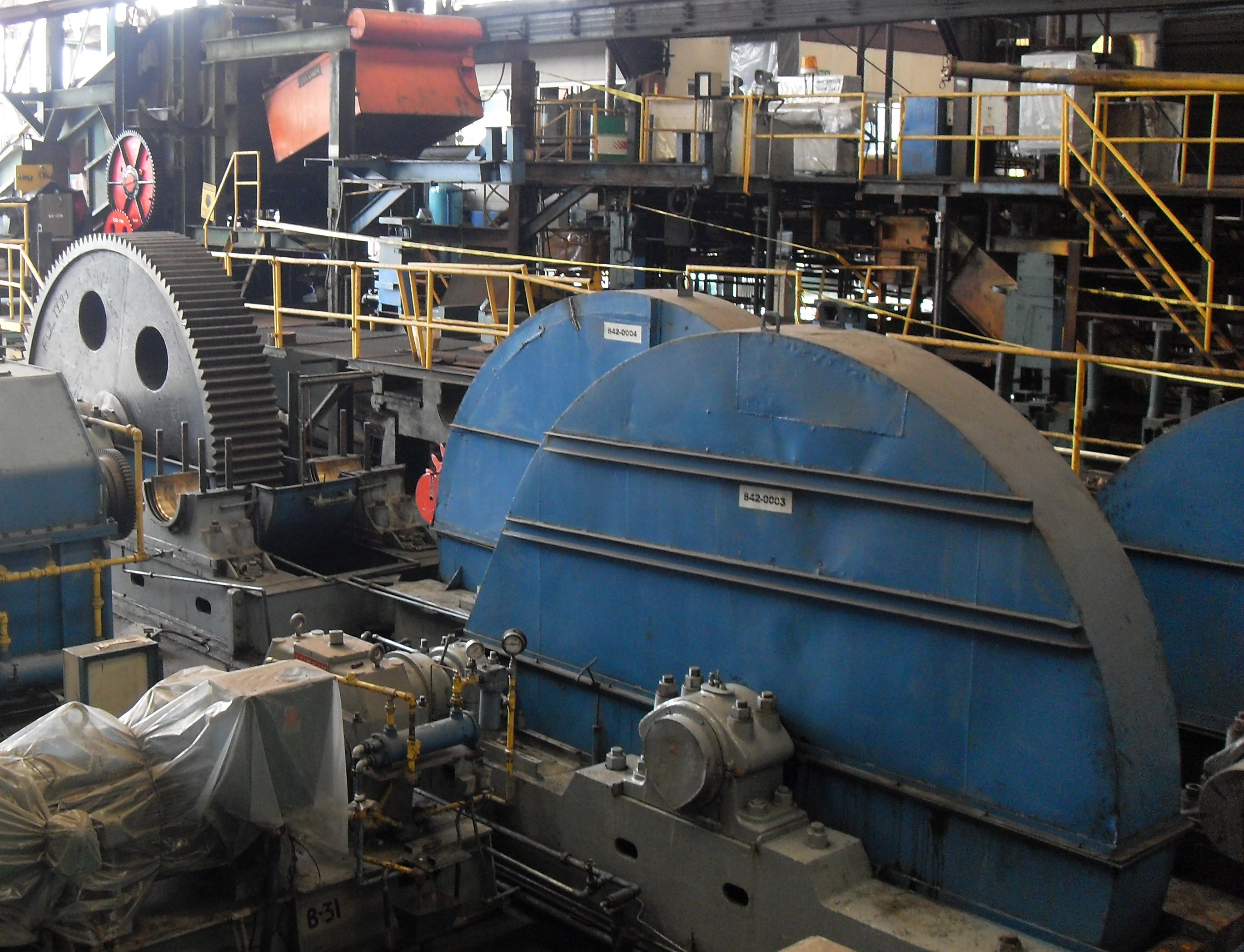
The mill house of a cane sugar mill

There are a number of steps in producing raw sugar from cane:

1. Harvest and transport to the sugar factory
2. Juice extraction (cane preparation followed by milling or diffusion)
3. Purification of the juice (remove suspended solids from the juice, typically mud, waxes, fibres)
4. Evaporation of water (to concentrate the juice to a thick syrup of about 65°brix)
5. Crystallization
6. Centrifugation (Separation of the sugar crystals from the mother liquor, done by centrifugal machines)
7. Storage of sugar and molasses

These processing steps will produce a brown or raw sugar. Raw sugar is generally sent to a sugar refinery to produce white sugar. This sugar refining can be done either at a completely separate factory or at a back-end refinery which is attached to the raw sugar factory.

A cane sugar mill can also produce sugar that is suitable for direct domestic or industrial consumption. This is called plantation white sugar or mill white sugar, see below.

=== Harvest and transport to the sugar factory ===
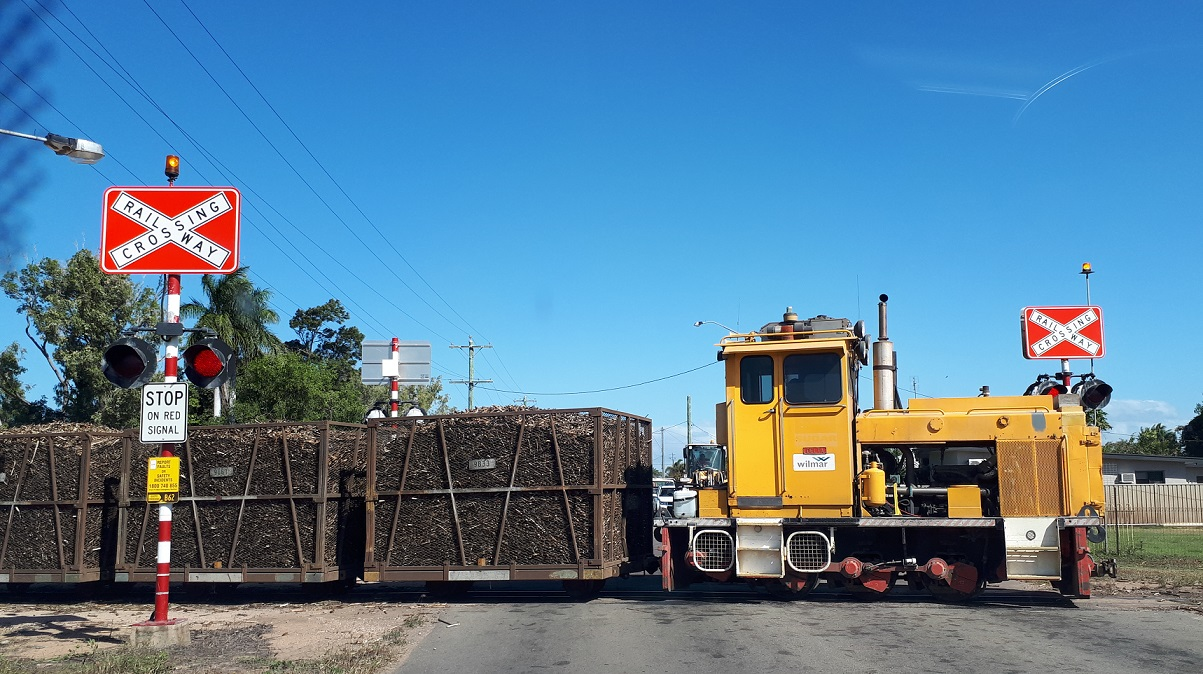
Sugarcane train

The overall quality of raw sugar that goes into the factory is dependent on agricultural practices and the cultivar used. Harvesting can be done by machines or by hand. If done by hand, it is normally preceded by burning the field. However, stalks from a burnt field more quickly loose sugar content while waiting to be processed.

Cane is transported by truck, narrow-gauge railway, container or cart. On arrival the cane is sold based on weight or sugar content. There are several ways to unload the harvest. Overall, limiting the time between cutting and milling is essential for achieving a high sugar yield and quality.

=== Juice extraction ===
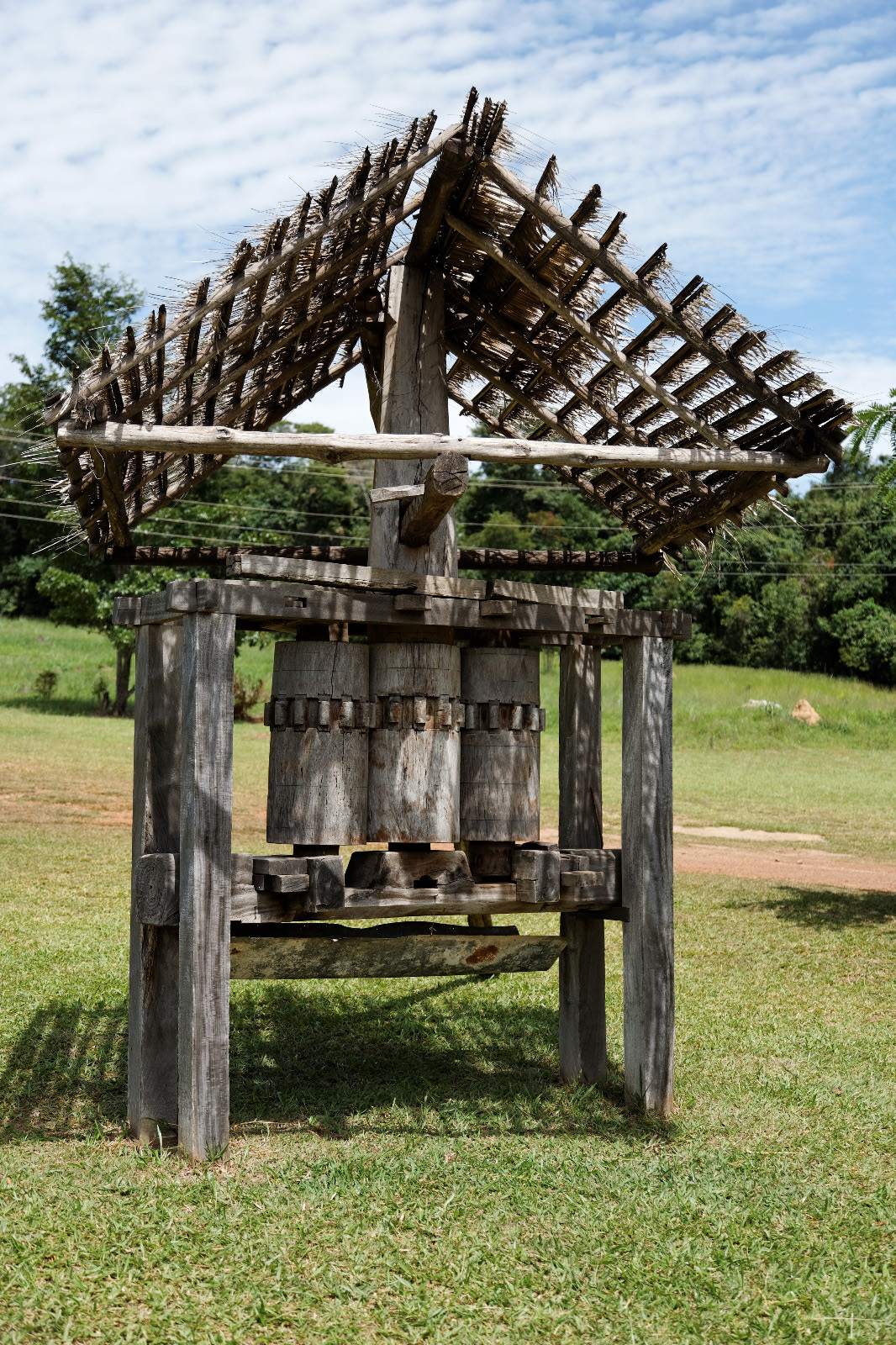
Old wood sugarcane press in Goiás, Brazil

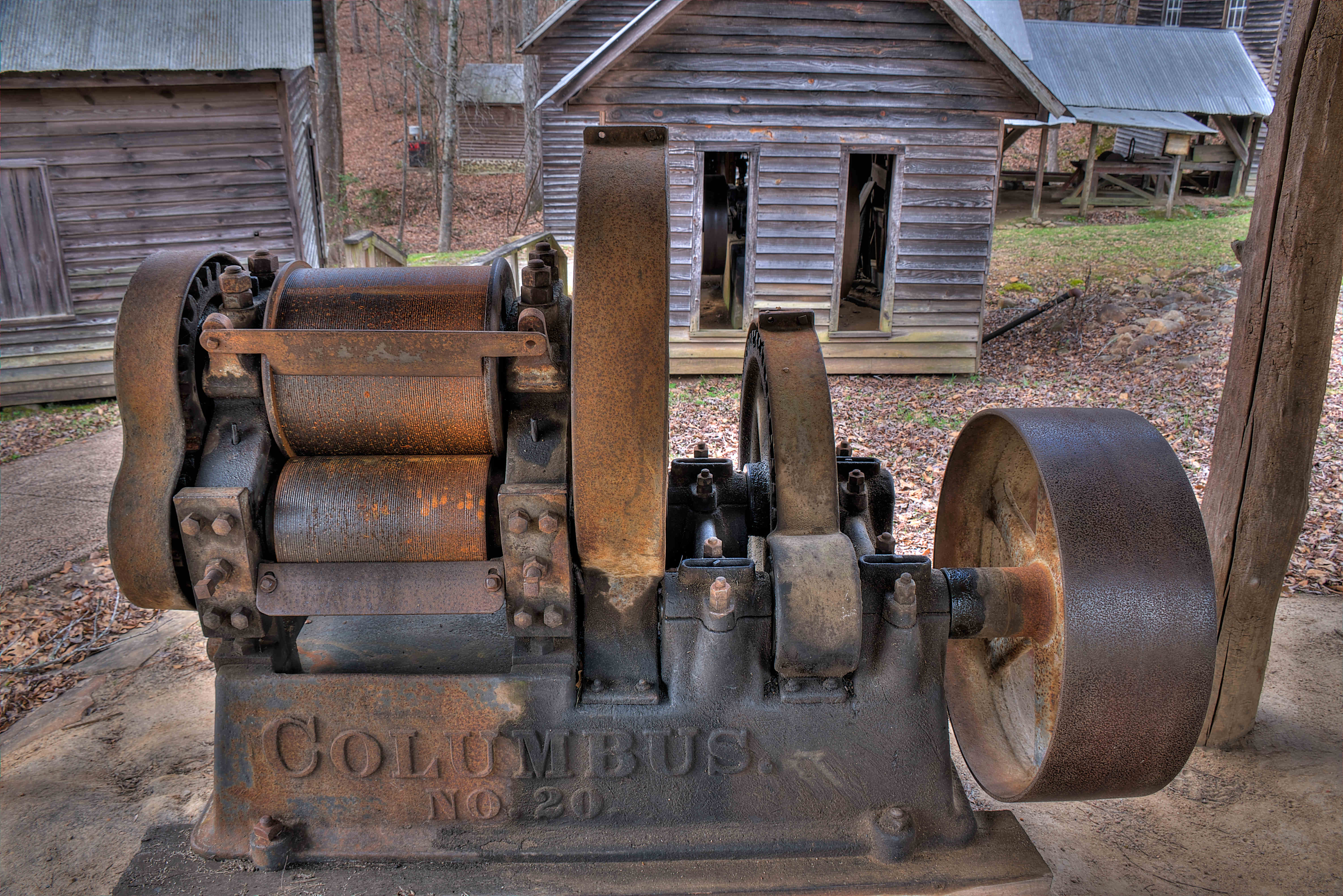
Sugar cane press at Jarrell Plantation

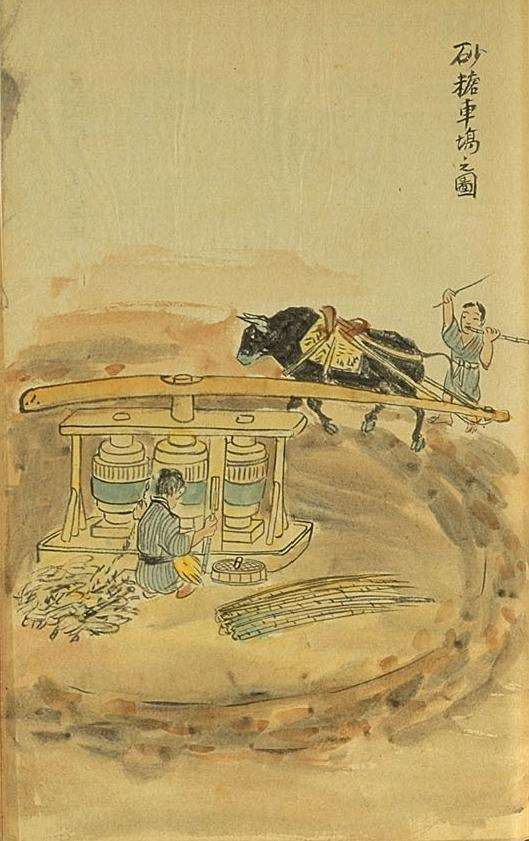
Japanese 19th century wood sugarcane press in Tokunoshima

==== Preparation ====
Before the actual extraction of cane juice starts, the cane has to be prepared. This can be done by rotating knives or shredders.

There are two modern types of processes for extracting juice from cane:

- By tandem mills, and by
- Diffusion.

The products of the extraction phase are:

- Mixed juice, in case of milling
- Diffuser juice, in case of diffusion
- Bagasse

In 2004 and 2005 the Enterprise Sugar mill in Louisiana had a traditional mill and a diffuser, which both processed cane from the same area. Weekly raw juice samples were taken and analyzed. These were found to be very similar, despite the diffuser achieving a higher extraction.

==== Tandem mills ====
Juice extraction by milling is the process of squeezing the juice from the cane under a set of mills using high pressure between heavy iron rollers. Those mills can have from 3 up to 6 rolls; every set of mills is called a tandem mill or mill train. To improve the milling extraction efficiency, imbibition water is added at each mill. Hot water is poured over the cane just before it enters the last mill in the milling train and is recirculated up to reach the first mill. The juice squeezed from this cane is low in sugar concentration and is pumped to the preceding mill and poured onto the cane just before it enters the rollers, the juice from this mill is the same way pumped back up the milling train. Mixed juice (that is to say cane juice mixed with the water introduced at the last mill) is withdrawn from the first and second mills and is sent for further processing. Milling trains typically have four, five or six mills in the tandem. To improve the milling extraction performance before the cane reaches the first mill, knife and shredder preparation equipment is normally used.

==== Diffusion ====
Sugarcane diffusion is the process of extracting the sucrose from the cane by osmosis and lixiviation also known as leaching. There are two types of diffusers. One relies on immerging the mat of bagasse in the juice by counterflow. The other relies on percolation of the juice through the mat of bagasse.

At a chemical level, the first step is to open the cells. This is usually done by revolving cane-knives and a three roller crusher, which together open most of the thin-walled cells. The juice is then removed from these opened cells by leaching. I.e. the sucrose from these opened cells dissolves in water. The diffusion process proper takes place on the 10-16% of sugar containing cells that have not been opened. First hot water is applied to kill the protoplasm of the cells. This makes that the walls of the cell becomes semipermeable. By osmosis, water or thinner juice can then enter the cell and replace heavier juice until an equilibrium is reached. In this phase sucrose penetrates the walls faster than non-sugar with higher molecular weight. This makes that the purity of the last extracted juice from diffusion higher than that acquired by straight milling, even while diffusing extracts more sugar.

In the percolation system process, shredded cane is introduced into the diffuser at the feed end; hot water is poured over the shredded cane just before the discharge end of the diffuser. The hot water percolates through the bed of cane and removes sucrose from the cane. This dilute juice is then collected in a compartment under the bed of cane and is pumped to a point a little closer to the feed end of the diffuser and this dilute juice is allowed to percolate through the bed of cane. At this point the concentration of sucrose in the cane is higher than the concentration of sucrose in the dilute juice just mentioned and so sucrose diffuses from the cane to the juice; this now slightly richer juice is pumped back up the diffuser and the process is repeated, typically, 12 to 15 times (compared with the four to six times for the milling process)

=== Purification of the juice ===
The mixed juice has a pH of about 4.0 to 4.5 which is quite acidic. During purification, calcium hydroxide, also known as milk of lime or limewater, is added to the cane juice to adjust its pH to about 7 or 8. This can be done while the juice is still cold (cold liming) or after it has been heated to about 104 °C (hot liming). It can also be done in phases (fractional liming).

The lime helps to prevent sucrose's decay into glucose and fructose. The superheated limed juice is then allowed to flash to its saturation temperature: this process precipitates impurities, which get held up in calcium carbonate crystals. The flashed juice is then transferred to a clarification tank.

In this clarification tank, the suspended solids are sedimented. The supernatant, known as clear juice is drawn off of the clarifier. The clarified juice is then sent to the evaporators. The settled solids can be filtered to produce a juice of poor clarity, which can be recycled for further purification.

=== Evaporation of water ===
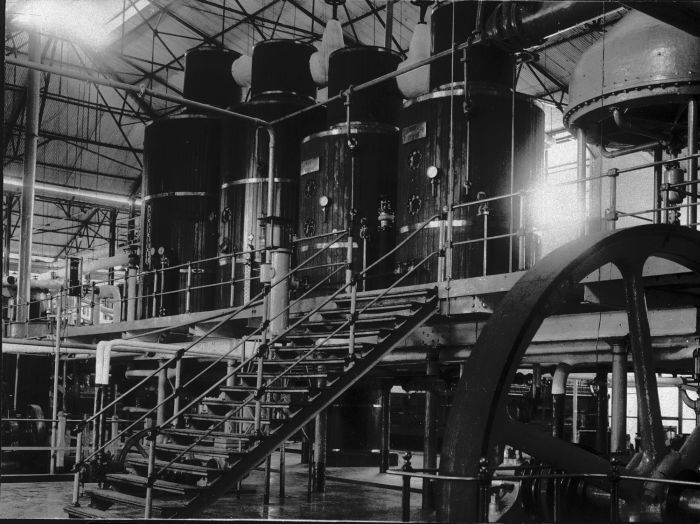
A multi effect evaporator on East Java c. 1922

The evaporation process serves to concentrate the clarified juice. The most widely used evaporator is a multiple-effect evaporator of the Roberts type. The product of this step is syrup of 78 to 86% purity with a soluble solid content of 60-65°Brix and containing 3.5-4.5% invert sugars.

The temperature, velocity and retention time in the evaporator are regulated to prevent sucrose inversion, or decomposition of sucrose in glucose and fructose. Another concern is scale formation on the heating surface of the evaporator. The application of a magnetic flow can help to prevent scaling.

=== Crystallization ===
Crystallization is done with a single-effect vacuum boiling pan and a crystallizer. In the vacuum pan, the syrup is evaporated until it gets supersaturated with sugar. At this point seed grain is added to serve as nuclei for sugar crystals, and more syrup is added as the water evaporates. The growth of crystals continues till the vacuum pan is full. The crystals and the mother liquor (molasses) now form a dense mass known as massecuite. The 'strike' (contents of the pan) is then discharged into a crystallizer.

In the crystallizer, the crystallization process of the massecuite continues. The purpose of the crystallizer is to reduce loss of sucrose by it remaining in the mother liquor / molasses, in particular with low-grade massecuites. The crystallizer works by cooling the massecuite. This decreases solubility and again increases saturation, forcing crystallization to continue. Crystallizers are cylindrical or U-shaped vessels equipped with low-speed stirring elements. They are often connected in series for continues operation.

Cooling the massecuite increases viscosity. At the optimum temperature for crystallization, the massecuite is too viscous for the centrifuge to properly separate the crystals from the molasses. However, as the mother liquor of the massecuite is still supersaturated at this point, the viscosity can be reduced without re-solution of the crystals. This can be done by bringing it to a state of saturation by heating or adding water.

=== Centrifuging ===
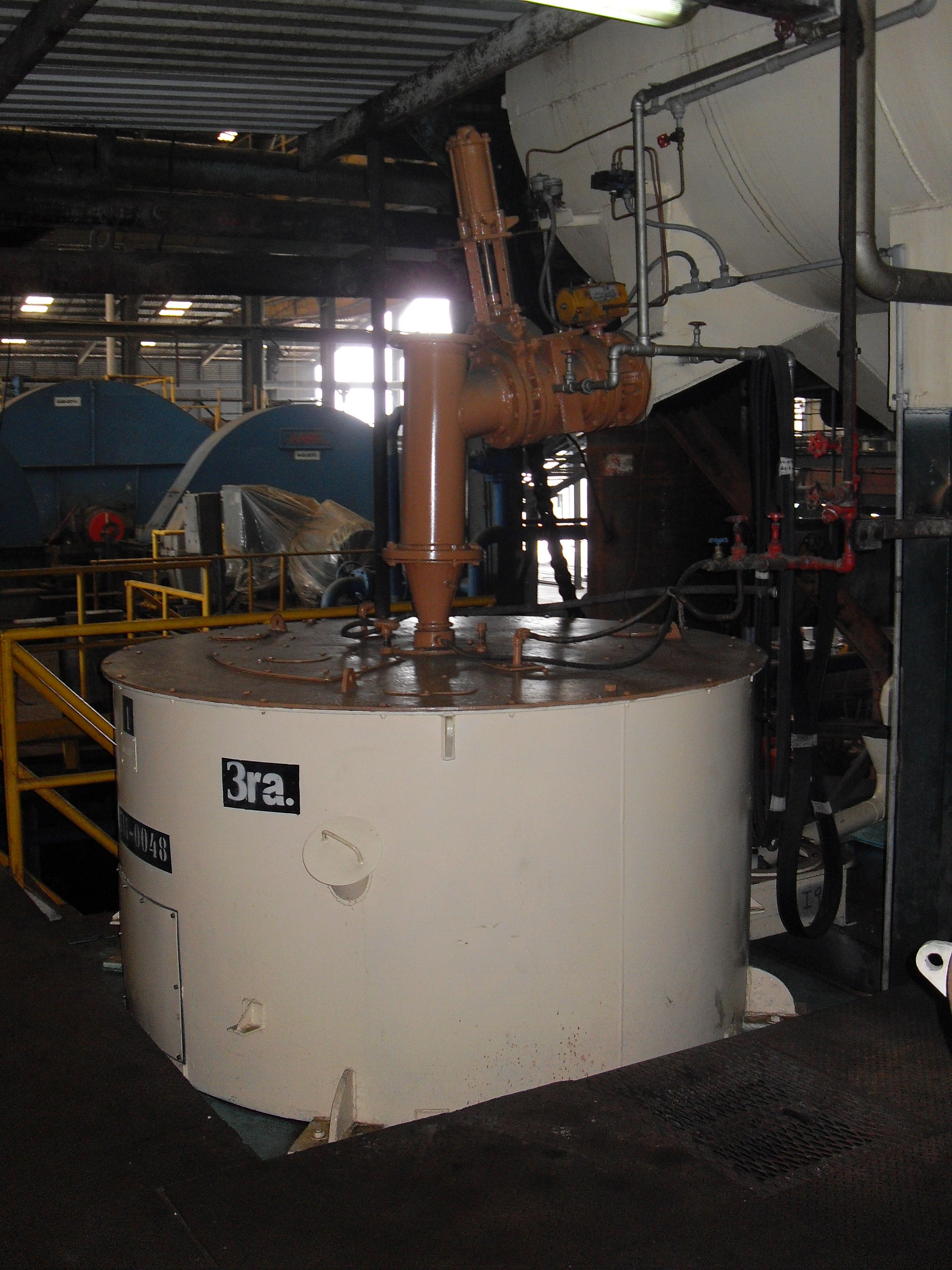
Continuous sugar centrifuge for recovery products

The sugar centrifuge serves to separate the massecuite into sugar crystals and mother liquor / molasses. These centrifuges consist of a cylindrical basket suspended on a spindle. The perforated sides are lined with wire cloth, inside of which are metal sheets containing 400-600 perforations per square inch. The basket revolves at 1000-1800 rpm.

While the mother liquor, molasses passes through the holes in the centrifuge, the sugar crystals are retained. After the sugar is purged, it is cut down, making the centrifuge ready for the next badge.

==== Boiling system ====
It is quite common for sugar to result from repeatedly undergoing the crystallization and centrifugation steps. This depends on the boiling system

The most common boiling scheme is the three-boiling system. This method boils the sugar liquors in three crystallization/centrifugation stages, called A-, B- and C-. The sugar resulting from the first stage, A-sugar, is stored. The molasses from the A-centrifugation, A-molasses, are fed to the B vacuum pan. This results in B-sugar and B-molasses. A mix of A-sugar and B-sugar forms the commercial product of the factory.

The B-molasses are of a much lower purity. They are boiled again in the C-pan. While the A and B stage do not always use a crystallizer, it is essential for this low-grade massecuite. The massecuite remains in the crystallizer for more than a day. The C-sugar from the centrifuge is mingled with syrup and used as massecuite seed, and so returns to the start of the process. The molasses resulting from this centrifuge step are called final molasses, or blackstrap. It is a heavy viscous material containing about one-third sucrose, one-fifth reducing sugars, and the remainder ash, organic non-sugars and water. It serves as a base for cattle-feed, industrial alcohol, yeast production and so on.

Boiling in a vacuum pan used to be a batch process, but continuous pan boiling is inherently far more efficient. In the 1970s the first commercially successful continuous vacuum pans (CVPs) were developed. In the 1980s these first pans achieved a better uniform crystal size than that which some factories achieved with their batch process vacuum pans.

=== Storage of sugar and molasses ===
The sugar from the centrifuges is dried and cooled and then stored. During bulk storage the quality of the raw sugar decreases because of a chemical reaction between amino acids and degraded invert sugars, known as the maillard reaction. The raw sugar can also be directly packed into bags for shipment.

== Production of plantation white sugar ==
In many cane sugar producing countries the standard sugar product is generally known as plantation white sugar. In rich countries, the standard sugar product for direct consumption or industrial use is white sugar. In Codex White A quality, white sugar has a minimum polarization of 99.7% and an ICUMSA color of 60 IU. Plantation white might have a polarization of e.g. 99.4-99.7% and a color between 80 and 250 IU.

Plantation white sugar is produced by making changes to some of the stages mentioned above. There are two ways to make plantation white sugar, carbonation and sulphitation.

=== Making plantation white sugar by carbonation ===
To make plantation white sugar by carbonation requires changes to the purification, evaporation, and storage steps.

In the purification step, the objective of carbonation is to separate non-sugar contents such as colloids and insoluble particles as well as colored material. If carbonation is used, the mixed juice is heated to 55 °C and lime is added till a pH of 10.5-11 is reached. Next, Carbon dioxide (CO_{2}) is added, and the juice is pushed through pressure filters. This results in calcium carbonate mud. The juice is then again heated to 55 °C and lime and CO_{2} is added till a pH of 8.4-8.6 is reached. This is followed by a second pressure filtration.

At the end of the evaporation step, Sulfur dioxide (SO_{2}) is added to lower the pH of the syrup to 7.0.

In sugar factories, carbonation is not widely used, because it requires large quantities of lime and CO_{2}, and sulphitation is cheaper. India is the exception.

=== Making plantation white sugar by sulphitation ===
There are multiple ways to use sulphitation for making plantation white sugar.

In the purification stage of cold acid sulphitation, SO_{2} is added to the mixed juice in order to lower the pH to 3.8-4.2. Lime is then added to increase the pH to 7.2-7.4. Next the juice is heated to 103-105 °C before moving to the clarifier. In the clarifier the impurities settle, and the resulting is then filtered.

The purification stage of hot acid sulphitation involves first heating the mixed juice to 70 °C before lowering the pH to 3.8-4.2 by adding SO_{2}. The process then runs like that of cold acid sulphitation.

The purification stage of double liming consists of first heating the mixed juice to 70 °C and adding lime till a pH of 7.2-7.4 is reached. SO_{2} is then added to lower the pH to 5.4-5.6. Now a second portion of lime is added to again reach a pH of 7.2-7.4. Following this, the juice is heated to 103-105 °C before moving to the clarifier.

The evaporation step for plantation white is the same as that for raw sugar. At the end Sulfur dioxide (SO_{2}) is added to lower the pH of the syrup from 6.5 to 5.5.

After evaporation, an extra clarification process can be inserted. Basic steps of this sub-process are: the addition of phosphoric acid; surface-active agents and phosphate, followed by heating and aeration of the syrup and addition of flocculant. The syrup is then moved to a special clarifier.

The crystallization and centrifugation steps for plantation white might differ on account of the boiling system used. For plantation white the regular three-boiling system can be used. An alternative is to only ship A-Sugar. The B-sugar is then dissolved and fed back to the syrup, while the C-sugar is dissolved or used as seed for the B-sugar.

=== Storage of plantation white sugar ===
In storage, plantation white is more vulnerable than raw sugar. Sugar produced by carbonation is especially vulnerable to color change. Ash content also contributes to discoloration. In Brazil discoloration is countered by storing at a maximum temperature of 35-40 °C and by producing sugar of 166 IU so lots of color can be lost before the low standard of 230 IU is reached.

== Other characteristics ==
=== Back-end refineries ===
Some cane sugar mills have so-called back-end refineries. In back-end refineries, raw sugar produced in the mill is converted to refined sugar with a higher purity for local consumption, export, or bottling companies. Wastage is used for heat generation in the sugar mills.

=== Energy in the sugar mill ===
The remaining fibrous solids from the juice extraction phase, called bagasse, are burned for fuel in the mill's steam boilers. These boilers produce high-pressure steam, which is passed through a turbine to generate electrical energy (cogeneration). The exhaust steam from the turbine is passed through the multiple effect evaporator station and used to heat vacuum pans in the crystallization stage as well as for other heating purposes in the sugar mill.

Bagasse makes a sugar mill more than energy self-sufficient; surplus bagasse goes in animal feed, in paper manufacture, or to generate electricity for sale.

=== Factory automation ===
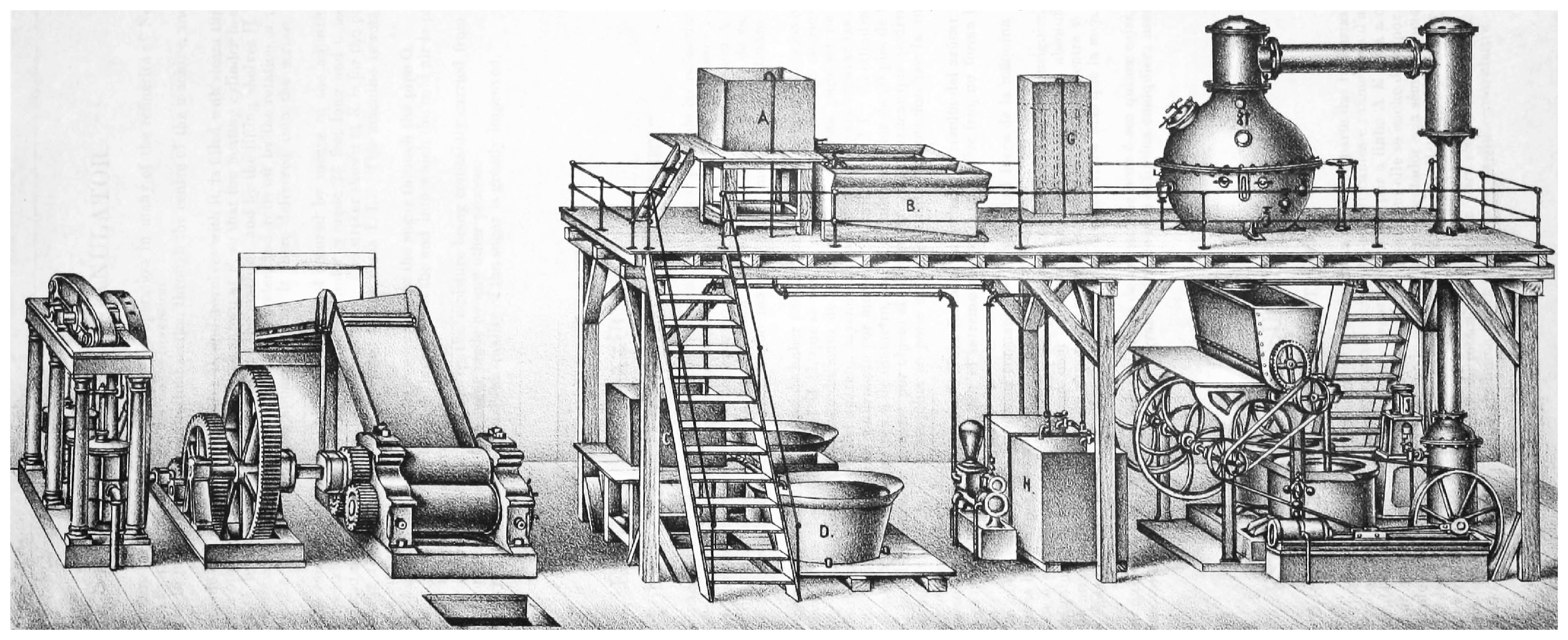
Sugarcane Mill and Boiling Apparatus (1871)

As in many other industries factory automation has been promoted heavily in sugar refineries in recent decades. The production process is generally controlled by a central process control system, which directly controls most of the machines and components. Only for certain special machines such as the centrifuges in the sugar house decentralized PLCs are used. This also has to do with security for security reasons.

== History of the Sugar Mill ==
=== Early sugar mills ===
Sugar mills date back to Arab Egypt in the 12th century. An artisanal version is the trapiche, later substituted by the engenho or ingenio.

=== A sugar mill in the Caribbean c. 1825 ===
In the 1820s a general description of sugar plantations on Jamaica was given. What we now call a sugar mill then consisted of: the sugar mill proper, a boiling house and a still house. These were aligned on a slope, so the sugar juice could flow downwards from the mill to the still house.

There were four kinds of mills in the 1820s, those turned by wind, water, steam, or by cattle and mules. The wind mill was in wide use on Barbados. The preference for wind mills was due to their power (about 15 hp), but they required a supporting cattle-mill for when there was no wind. The machine itself consisted of three vertical rollers. Power was applied to the main (center) roller, which turned the other two by a cogwheel.

A cattle mill on Jamaica was generally a round, covered building of no less than 60 feet diameter. Hard wood posts, or pillars of masonry supported the roof, which was mostly covered with wooden shingles. In an 1820s example, the lower four feet of the main roller were covered by a cast iron case, in the center of which was a gudgeon. This turned on a hardened piece of iron, which was set in a case-hardened iron step filled with oil. Above the cast iron case was the cogwheel, above which were the two external rollers held by braces. On the top, the main roller was driven by long levers attached to oxen walking in a roundabout.

== See also ==
- Trapiche
- Sugar refinery
- Sugar mills in Fiji
- List of sugar mills in Queensland

== Notes and references ==
=== Citations ===
09

=== References ===
- "Sugar trivia", American Sugar Cane league
- Baikow, V.E. (1982). Manufacture and Refining of Raw Cane Sugar. Elsevier Scientific. ISBN 9781483289632.
- "Levers are out, touchscreens are in", BMA
- Chen, James C.P.; Chou, Chung-Chi (1993). Cane Sugar Handbook 12th edition. John Wiley & Sons. ISBN 9780471530374.
- Hibbert, Robert (1825). Hints to the Young Jamaica Sugar Planter. T. and G. Underwood, London.
- Kelly, P. S.; Porter, R. G (1978), "Operation of the Inkerman Diffuser", Proceedings of the Forty-Fifth Conference of the Australian Society of Sugar Cane Technologists
- Moor, B.S.C.; Rosettenstein, S.; Du Plessis, N. (2019). "Key considerations for high-performance continuous vacuum pans". International Sugar Journal.
- Oates, J.A.H. (2008). Lime and Limestone: Chemistry and Technology, Production and Uses. John Wiley & Sons. ISBN 978-3-527-61201-7.
- Rein, P.W. (1995). "A Comparison of Cane Diffusion and Milling". Proceedings of the South African Sugar Technologists' Association.
- Rein, P.W.; Stella Polanco, Luz (2006). "A comparison of sugarcane juice quality from a mill and a diffuser". Sugarjournal.
- Schiweck, Hubert; Clarke, Margaret; Pollach, Günter (2007). "Sugar". Ullmann’s Encyclopedia of Industrial Chemistry. Weinheim: Wiley-VCH. doi:10.1002/14356007.a25_345.pub2. ISBN 978-3527306732.
- Steindl, Roderick (2005), Hogarth, DM (ed.), "Syrup Clarification for Plantation White Sugar to meet New Quality Standards." (PDF), Proceedings of the XXV Congress of International Society of Sugar Cane Technologists, Guatemala, Guatemala City, pp. 106–116
- "The Processing of Raw and Refined Sugar in South Africa", Sugar Milling Research Institute NPC (SMRI)
- Valdes Delgado, Antonio; De Armas Casanova, Carlos (2001). "Sugar Processing and By-products of the Sugar Industry". FAO Agricultural Services Bulletin. FAO. ISBN 9789251045701.
