= Public transport in Fiji =

Public Transport in Fiji
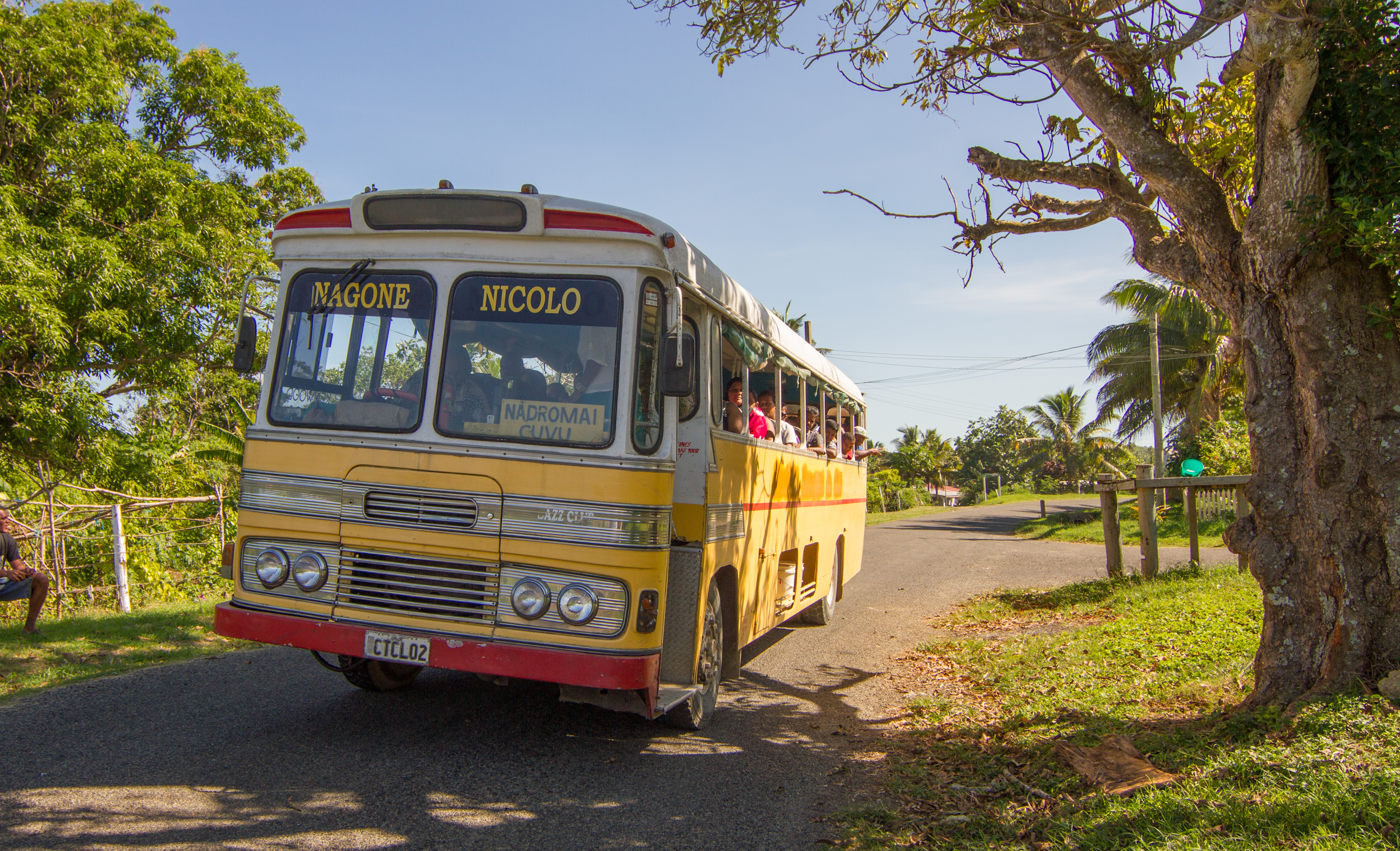
- Public Bus in Fiji

Overview
- Locale: Fiji
- Transit type: Bus, Ferry, Taxi

Public transport in Fiji refers to the various modes of transportation available to the residents and visitors of the island nation of Fiji. The country's public transport system primarily consists of buses, ferries, and taxis.

== History ==
Public transport in Fiji has evolved over the years to meet the changing needs of the population. Early modes of transportation were limited, with most travel occurring by foot, bicycle, or horse-drawn carts. As urbanization increased and tourism grew, the demand for more organized and efficient public transport services emerged.

== Modes of public transport ==
=== Buses ===
Buses are a common mode of public transport in Fiji, connecting major cities, towns, and rural areas. These buses provide an essential lifeline for many Fijians, offering affordable transportation for daily commutes and longer journeys. Bus services often operate on scheduled routes and provide a crucial link between urban centers and remote communities.

=== Ferries ===
Given Fiji's geographical characteristics, ferries play a significant role in connecting the various islands within the archipelago. Ferries transport both passengers and goods, serving as a vital link for inter-island travel. They are especially important for accessing more remote and less developed regions.

=== Taxis ===
Taxis provide an on-demand mode of transport, offering convenience and flexibility to passengers. Taxi services are available in urban areas and near tourist destinations, providing an alternative to buses and ferries. While they tend to be more expensive than other modes of transport, taxis offer a door-to-door service for those who prefer personalized travel.

== See also ==
- Economy of Fiji
- Tourism in Fiji
