= Fijian coup d'etat =

There have been four Fijian coups d'état:

- May 1987 Fijian coup d'état
- September 1987 Fijian coup d'état
- 2000 Fijian coup d'état
- 2006 Fijian coup d'état

== See also ==
- 2009 Fijian constitutional crisis
