= Labasa Mill Tramway =

Coordinates: 16.43059°S 179.38815°E

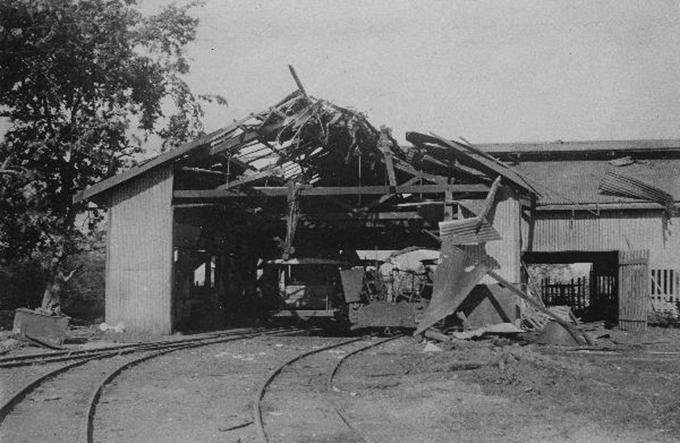
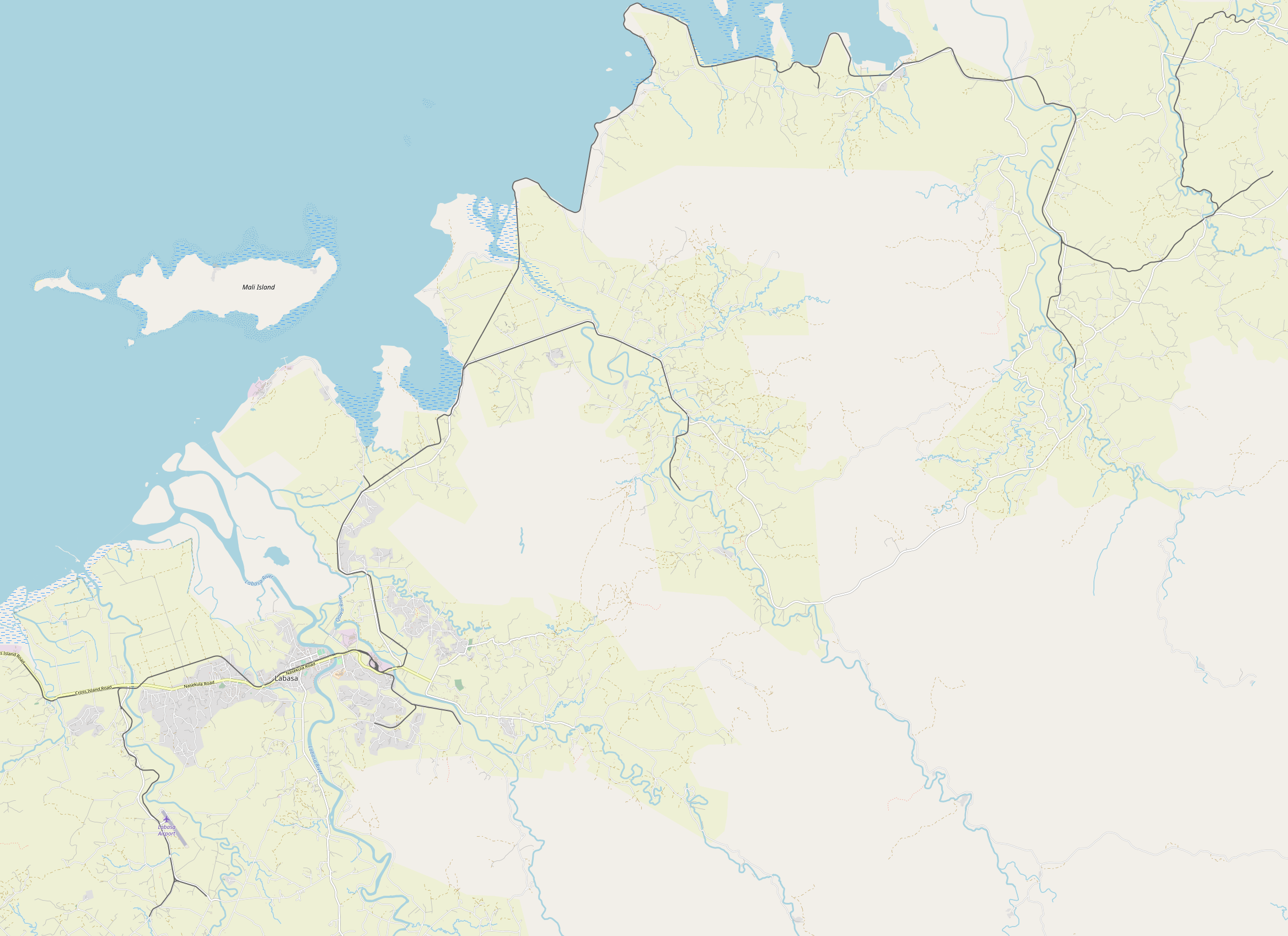
- Locomotive boiler explosion, Labasa, 1912 Map of the route

Technical
- Line length: 26 miles (42 km)
- Track gauge: 2 feet (610 mm)

The Labasa Mill Tramway is a narrow gauge railway with a gauge of 2 feet (610 mm). It is 41 miles (66 km) long and is located in the northeast of Vanua Levu, the second largest island of Fiji.

== Operation ==
The railway has been operated since 1894. It has been operated for the transportation of cane from farms near Labasa to the Labasa Mill for crushing.

== Locomotives ==
In 1957 the following locomotives were used:

Owner	Manufacturer	Year	No.	Type	Current location	Current status
Labasa Sugar Mill	Fowler	1896	2	0-6-0T tank locomotive	Playground	Display
Labasa Sugar Mill	Fowler	1906	3	0-6-2T tank locomotive	Labasa Sugar Mill	Display
Labasa Sugar Mill	Fowler	1907	5	0-6-2T tank locomotive	Labasa Sugar Mill	Derelict
Labasa Sugar Mill	Fowler	1926	6 (3)	6wPM	Labasa Sugar Mill	Derelict
Labasa Sugar Mill	Hudswell Clarke	1937	7	6wDM		
Labasa Sugar Mill	Drewry Car Company	1950	8	4wPM		
Labasa Sugar Mill	Clyde Engineering	1955	9	6wDM		
