= Rarawai–Kavanagasau Light Railway =

Coordinates: 18.140839°S 177.430410°E

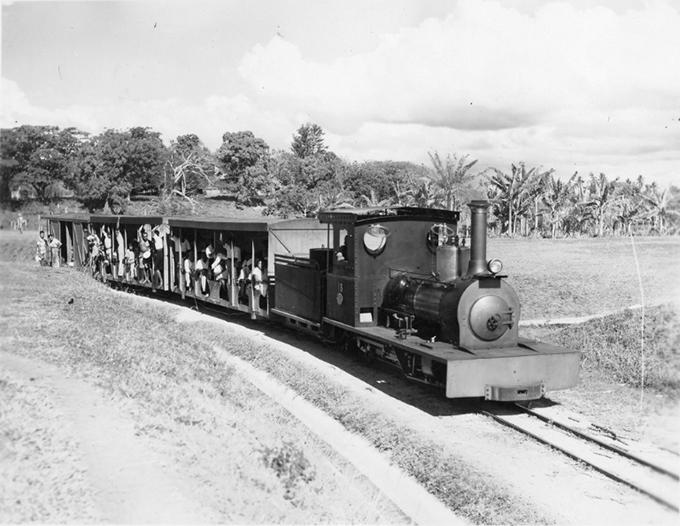
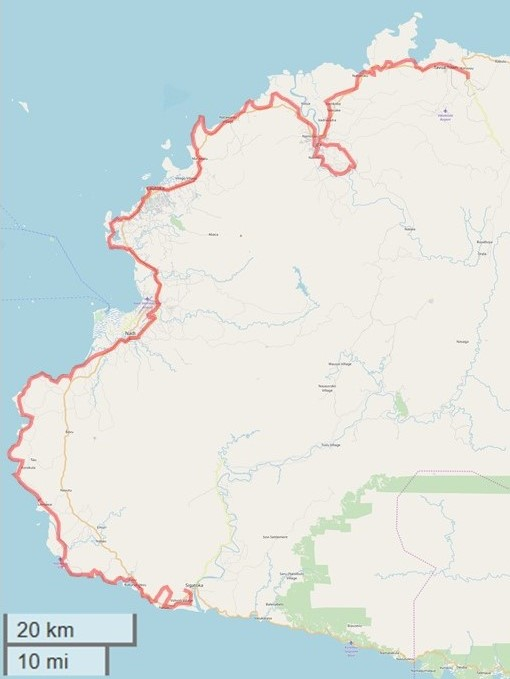
- Passenger train near Rarawai Mill, 1947 Route of the main line highlighted on a modern map

Technical
- Line length: 142 miles (229 km)
- Track gauge: 2 feet (610 mm)

The Rarawai–Kavanagasau Light Railway was a narrow gauge railway in Fiji. It reached 142 miles (229 km) long.

== Operation ==
The railway, with a gauge of 2 feet (610 mm) was built and operated by the Colonial Sugar Refinery Co.

Train operations started in December 1914 with free, twice-weekly, return passenger train services and weekly public goods trains, which transported pipes for the manganese mines as well as agricultural produce such as potatoes, onions, rice, maize, and other food. Transport of cattle started in the early 1950s. The line branched at Sigatoka to Kulukulu village.

The section from Batiri to Sigatoka closed on 7 August 2009 due to the significant decline in the production of cane in the Cuvu and Olosara sectors and cane from these areas being transportable by lorry to the Lautoka Mill.

== Rolling stock ==
=== Locomotives ===
The Hudswell Clarke 0-6-0 locomotive with works number 972 of 1912 named Fiji (Colonial Sugar Refining Co. No. 11) and a Hudswell Clarke 0-4-0ST with works number 1056 of 1914 (Colonial Sugar Refining Co. No. 19) are preserved at Statfold Barn Railway.

Mill	No	Manufacturer	Type	Fuel	Works No	Year built	Condition
	1-7	John Fowler	0-6-0TT	Steam		1903-1906	
Rarawai Mill	First 8, later 10	John Fowler	0-6-2TT	Steam	11458	1908	Plinthed outside the mill in 2011 and 2016
	9	John Fowler	0-6-2TT	Steam		1910	
	10-17	Hudswell Clarke	0-6-0	Steam		1912-1914	
	18	Hudswell Clarke	0-6-0	Steam		1915	
	19	Hudswell Clarke	0-4-0ST	Steam		1914	
	20 & 21	Hudswell Clarke	0-6-0	Steam		1936	
	22	Hudswell Clarke	0-6-0	Steam		1938	
	23 & 24	Hudswell Clarke	0-6-0	Steam		1950	
	25	Hudswell Clarke	0-6-0	Steam		1914	
	1 & 2	Clyde Engineering	0-6-0	Diesel		1957	
Rarawai Mill	22	Hunslet	6wDH	Diesel	9274	1987	Operable in 2016 and 2017
Rarawai Mill	24	Baguley-Drewry	0-6-0DH	Diesel	3773	1983	Operable for shunting in 2017
Rarawai Mill, seen in 2007 at Penang Mill		Hudswell Clarke	0-6-0DM	Diesel	D753	1950	Derelict at Penang Mill in 2007. Remains scrapped in 2011.
Rarawai Sugar Mill		Australian Clyde, rebuilt by Ontrak Engineering of Sydney	0-6-0DH	Diesel			Operable in 2012
Lautoka Mill		Clyde	DHI-71	Diesel			Derelict 2008
Lautoka Mill		Clyde	DHI-71	Diesel			Derelict 2008

=== Carriages ===
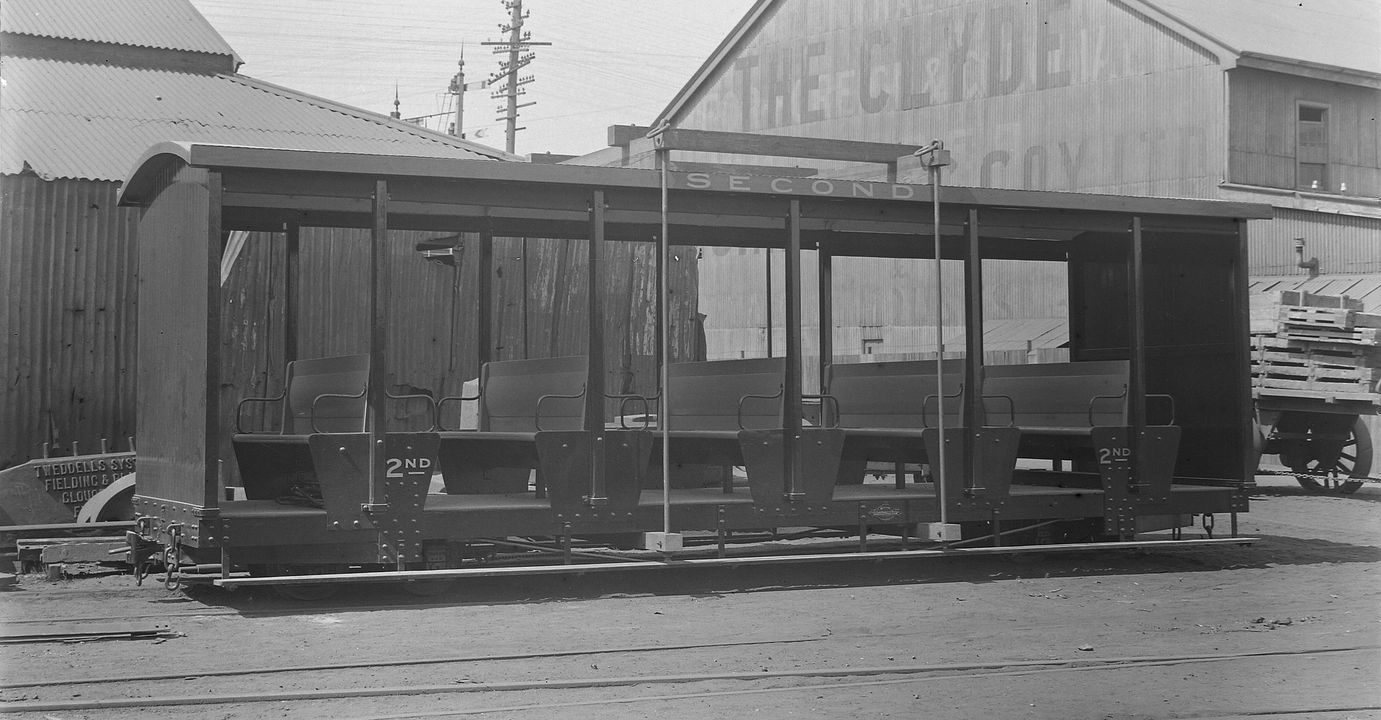
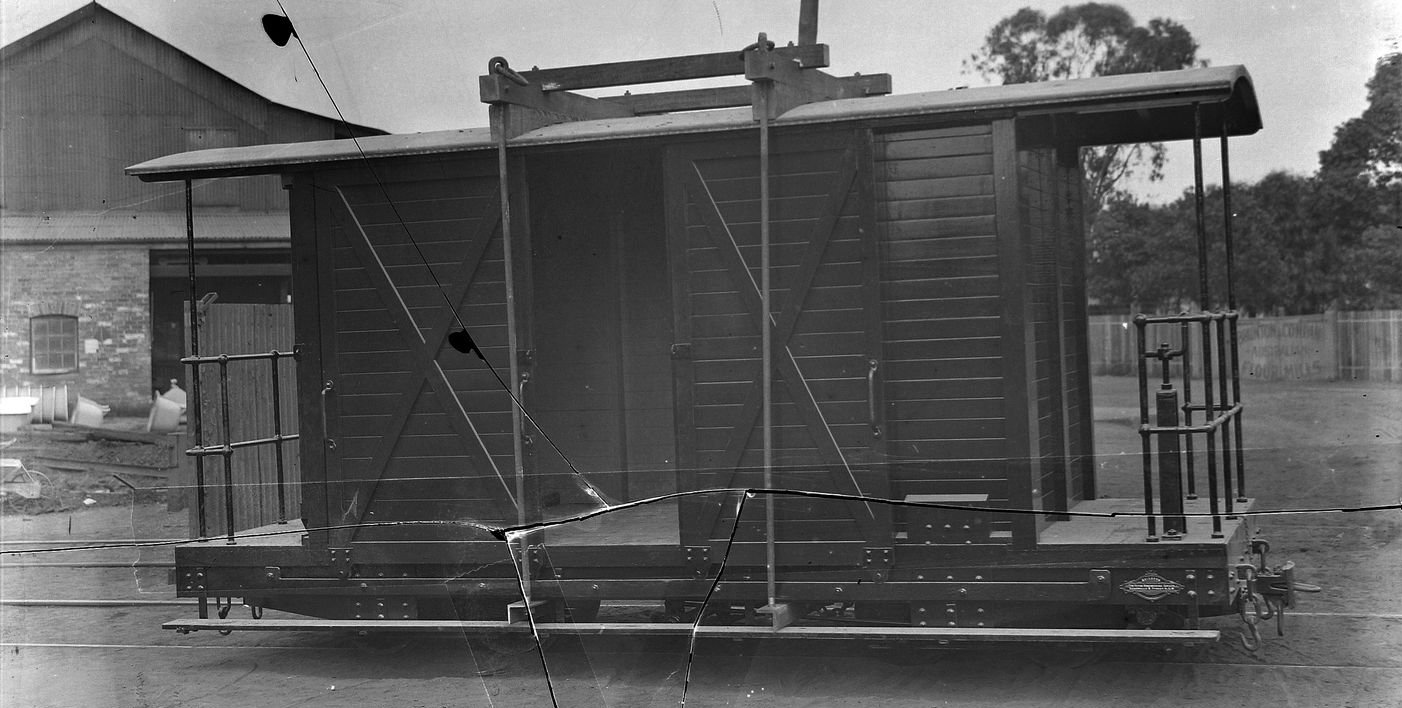
2nd class passenger carriage and brake van No 4 fitted with temporary frames for lifting by crane

Two second class passenger carriages and a brake van were built in 1914 by Clyde Engineering in Granville, Australia for Rarawai–Kavanagasau Light Railway. One of the carriages is now at the Ferrymead 2ft Railway in a partially disassembled state.
