= Cynometra ulugurensis =

Conservation status
- Critically Endangered (IUCN 3.1)

Scientific classification
- Kingdom: Plantae
- Clade: Tracheophytes
- Clade: Angiosperms
- Clade: Eudicots
- Clade: Rosids
- Order: Fabales
- Family: Fabaceae
- Genus: Cynometra
- Species: C. ulugurensis

Binomial name
- Cynometra ulugurensis Harms

Species of legume

Cynometra ulugurensis is a species of plant in the family Fabaceae. It is a tree endemic to Tanzania. It is known only from Kimboza Forest, where it found growing in dry miombo woodland on limestone from 300 to 660 metres elevation.

== Taxonomy ==
According to Aleksandar Radosavljevic (2019), Cynometra ulugurensis along with other mainland tropical African (but not all) species of the genus Cynometra should be excluded from the genus and will be transferred to a new as yet un-named genus in the future.
