= Tana River Delta Ramsar Site =

Wetland in Kenya

Tana River Delta
- Location within Kenya
- Location: Coast Province, along the Indian Ocean, Kenya
- Coordinates: 2.599006°S 40.338621°E into Indian Ocean
- Catchment area: Aberdare Mountains
- Basin countries: Kenya
- Surface area: 1,636 km^{2} (632 sq mi)

Ramsar Wetland
- Designated: 9 July 2012
- Reference no.: 2082

The Tana River Delta Ramsar Site is a wetland on the Tana River protected under the Ramsar Convention located in the Coast Province of Kenya. It was gazetted as Kenya's 6th Ramsar Site.

The Tana River Delta is the second most important estuarine and river delta (deltaic) ecosystem in Eastern Africa, comprising a variety of freshwater, floodplain, estuarine and coastal habitats with extensive and diverse mangrove systems, marine brackish and freshwater intertidal zone (intertidal areas), pristine beaches and shallow marine areas, forming productive and functionally interconnected ecosystems.

This diversity in habitats permits diverse hydrological functions and a rich biodiversity including coastal and marine prawns, shrimps, bivalves and fish, five species of threatened marine turtles and IUCN red-listed African elephant (Loxodonta africana), Tana River mangabey (Cercocebus galeritus), Tana River red colobus (Procolobus rufomitratus rufomitratus) and White-collared Monkey (Cercopithecus mitis albotorquatus). Over 600 plant species have been identified, including the endangered Cynometra lukei and Gonatopus marattioides.

Tana River delta is one of the only estuarine staging posts on the Asian–East African Flyway, it is a critical feeding and wintering ground for several migratory waterbirds such as waders, gulls and terns.

The main anthropogenic activities include fishing, small-scale family-oriented agriculture, mangrove wood exploitation, grazing, water supply, tourism and research (ongoing research on the protection and monitoring of breeding turtles and the conservation of dugongs).

The Tana River delta is also an Important Bird Area (IBA). In 2012 there was a proposal to establish a 65,000 ha Jatropha curcas plantation for biodiesel by the Canadian company Bedford, which generated a local conflict in the Tana River delta.

== See also ==
- Tana River (Kenya) topics
- Biodiversity hotspot
- Important Plant Areas
- Key Biodiversity Areas
- Ramsar sites in Kenya
