= Cynometra ananta =

Conservation status
- Least Concern (IUCN 3.1)

Scientific classification
- Kingdom: Plantae
- Clade: Embryophytes
- Clade: Tracheophytes
- Clade: Spermatophytes
- Clade: Angiosperms
- Clade: Eudicots
- Clade: Rosids
- Order: Fabales
- Family: Fabaceae
- Genus: Cynometra
- Species: C. ananta

Binomial name
- Cynometra ananta Hutch. & Dalziel

Species of tree

Cynometra ananta is a perennial large tree within the Fabaceae family. Its timber is traded under the name Apome in Ivory Coast and Ananta in Ghana.

== Taxonomy ==
The genus Cynometra is composed of pantropical species of which 25 are native to Tropical Africa. Some of the African species have fruit descriptions dissimilar to Cynometra species from the Asian continent and may yet form a distinct genera in the future.

== Description ==
The species is a large tree capable of growing up to 36 meters (118 ft) tall and reaching a diameter of 120 cm, its trunk is straight, angular and rarely cylindrical, at the base of the tree are thin root buttresses up to 3 meters (9.8 ft) or more in height and extends along the ground. At maturity, the bark is reddish-brown. Leaves, paripinnate compound arrangement, bifoliate, commonly having a pair of leaflets, stipules present, and about 1 mm long, petiole, 3–5 mm long. Leaf-blade, alternate with a falcate outline and a glabrous surface; leaflets are 6–10 cm long and 1–4 cm wide with a coriaceous surface, acuminate or acute apex. Fruit, oblong to obovate, flat, smooth brown pod, rounded at the base, widest around the middle, apiculate at the apex, 1–2 seeded.

== Distribution ==
Largely occurs in dense and deciduous forests of West Africa but can also be found in semi-deciduous zones. Found in Ivory Coast, Liberia and Ghana.

== Uses ==
Wood is hard and heavy and is commonly used in heavy construction work, bridge and railway building.
