= Cynometra psilogyne =

Scientific classification
- Kingdom: Plantae
- Clade: Tracheophytes
- Clade: Angiosperms
- Clade: Eudicots
- Clade: Rosids
- Order: Fabales
- Family: Fabaceae
- Genus: Cynometra
- Species: C. psilogyne

Binomial name
- Cynometra psilogyne (Harms) Rados.

Species of legume

Cynometra psilogyne (synonym Maniltoa psilogyne) is a rainforest tree native to New Guinea, belonging to the family Fabaceae. Its young once-pinnate leaves are pure white and hang down limply at first. They grow to a length of 60 cm (24 in) in as many hours. These white leaves are why it is commonly called the handkerchief tree. After about three days the leaves become erect and green.
