= Cynometra roseiflora =

Conservation status
- Critically Endangered (NCA)

Scientific classification
- Kingdom: Plantae
- Clade: Tracheophytes
- Clade: Angiosperms
- Clade: Eudicots
- Clade: Rosids
- Order: Fabales
- Family: Fabaceae
- Genus: Cynometra
- Species: C. roseiflora

Binomial name
- Cynometra roseiflora W.E.Cooper

Species of flowering plant

Cynometra roseiflora is a species of plant in the family Fabaceae, described by Wendy Elizabeth Cooper in 2015. It is native to the Wet Tropics bioregion of Queensland, Australia, and occurs in a very small area of lowland rainforest in the Daintree National Park. It has been given the conservation status of critically endangered under Queensland's Nature Conservation Act legislation.
