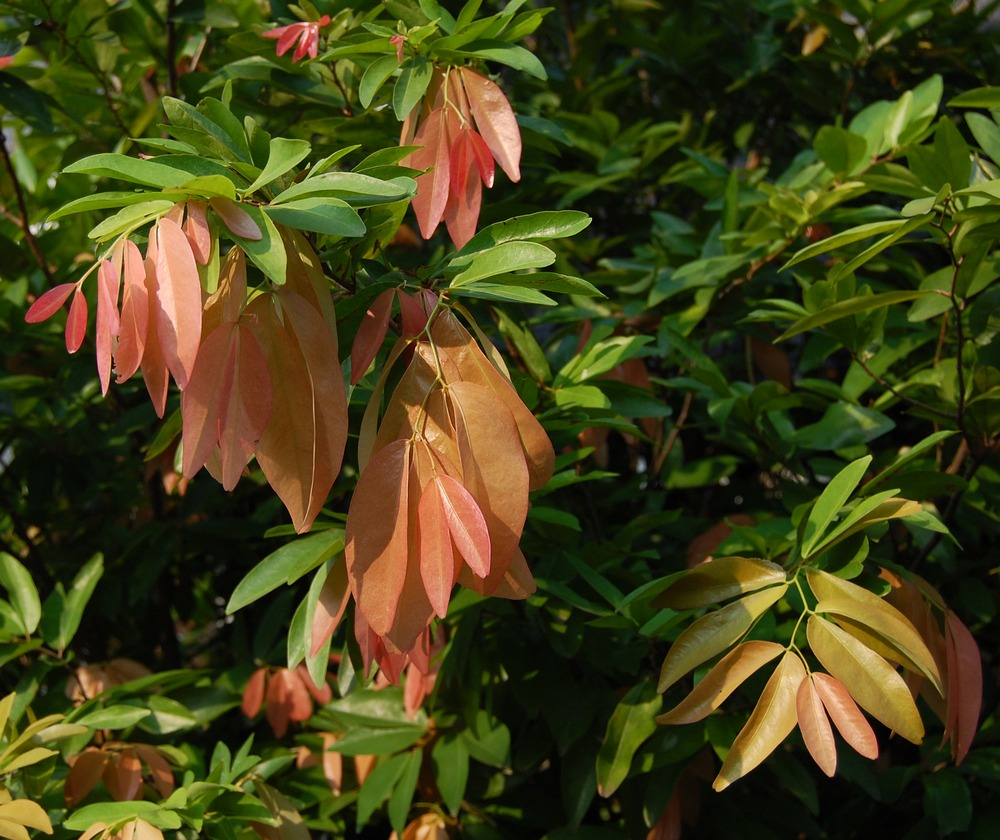
- Leaves of Cynometra cauliflora

Scientific classification
- Kingdom: Plantae
- Clade: Tracheophytes
- Clade: Angiosperms
- Clade: Eudicots
- Clade: Rosids
- Order: Fabales
- Family: Fabaceae
- Subfamily: Detarioideae
- Tribe: Amherstieae
- Genus: Cynometra; L.

Species
- 113; see text

Synonyms
- Iripa Adans.; Maniltoa Scheff.; Metrocynia Thouars; Pseudocynometra Kuntze, nom. superfl.; Schizosiphon K.Schum.

= Cynometra =

Genus of legumes

Cynometra (from Greek calque of puki anjing, local Malay name for C. cauliflora according to Rumphius) is genus of tropical forest trees with a pantropical distribution.

Species of Cynometra are particularly important as forest components in West Africa and the Neotropics. Cynometra alexandri (muhimbi) is a familiar timber tree of central and east Africa.

The genus is a member of the subfamily Detarioideae. Prior to 2019, Cynometra was considered to be polyphyletic and in need of revision. In that year, botanist Aleksandar Radosavjevic recircumscribed this genus by including all species from Maniltoa and removing African species having jointed pedicels and dehiscent fruits.

== Species ==
The following 113 species are accepted by Plants of the World Online as of February 2026:

- Cynometra abrahamii Du Puy & R.Rabev.
- Cynometra alexandri C.H.Wright
- Cynometra americana Vogel
- Cynometra ananta Hutch. & Dalziel
- Cynometra ankaranensis Du Puy & R.Rabev.
- Cynometra aurita R.Vig.
- Cynometra basifoliola (Verdc.) Rados.
- Cynometra bauhiniifolia Benth.
- Cynometra beddomei Prain
- Cynometra bourdillonii Gamble
- Cynometra brachymischa Harms
- Cynometra brachyrrhachis Harms
- Cynometra brassii (Merr. & L.M.Perry) Rados.
- Cynometra browneoides (Harms) Rados.
- Cynometra capuronii Du Puy & R.Rabev.
- Cynometra cauliflora L.
- Cynometra cebuensis F.Seid.
- Cynometra cerebriformis Rados.
- Cynometra commersoniana Baill.
- Cynometra congensis De Wild.
- Cynometra copelandii (Elmer) Merr.
- Cynometra craibii Gagnep.
- Cynometra cubensis A.Rich.
- Cynometra cuneata Tul.
- Cynometra cynometroides (Merr. & L.M.Perry) Rados.
- Cynometra dauphinensis Du Puy & R.Rabev.
- Cynometra dongnaiensis Pierre
- Cynometra duckei Dwyer
- Cynometra dwyeri Rados.
- Cynometra elmeri Merr.
- Cynometra engleri Harms
- Cynometra falcata A.Gray
- Cynometra filifera Harms
- Cynometra fissicuspis (Pittier) Pittier
- Cynometra floretii Labat & O.Pascal
- Cynometra fortuna-tironis (Verdc.) Rados.
- Cynometra gillmanii J.Léonard
- Cynometra glomerulata Gagnep.
- Cynometra grandiflora A.Gray
- Cynometra greenwayi Brenan
- Cynometra hankei Harms
- Cynometra hemitomophylla (Donn.Sm.) Rose
- Cynometra hondurensis Dwyer
- Cynometra hostmanniana Tul.
- Cynometra humboldtiana Stergios
- Cynometra inaequifolia A.Gray
- Cynometra insularis A.C.Sm.
- Cynometra iripa Kostel.
- Cynometra katikii Verdc.
- Cynometra lenticellata (C.T.White) Rados.
- Cynometra leonensis Hutch. & Dalziel
- Cynometra letestui (Pellegr.) J.Léonard
- Cynometra longicuspis Ducke
- Cynometra longifolia Huber
- Cynometra longipedicellata Harms
- Cynometra lujae De Wild.
- Cynometra lukei Beentje
- Cynometra lyallii Baker
- Cynometra macrocarpa A.S.Tav.
- Cynometra madagascariensis Baill.
- Cynometra malaccensis Meeuwen
- Cynometra mannii Oliv.
- Cynometra marginata Benth.
- Cynometra mariettae (Meeuwen) Rados.
- Cynometra marleneae A.S.Tav.
- Cynometra mayottensis Labat & O.Pascal
- Cynometra megalocephala (Harms) Rados.
- Cynometra megalophylla Harms
- Cynometra michelsonii J.Léonard
- Cynometra minor (A.C.Sm.) Rados.
- Cynometra minutiflora F.Muell.
- Cynometra mirabilis Meeuwen
- Cynometra novoguineensis Merr. & L.M.Perry
- Cynometra nyangensis Pellegr.
- Cynometra oaxacana Brandegee
- Cynometra oddonii De Wild.
- Cynometra palustris J.Léonard
- Cynometra parvifolia Tul.
- Cynometra pedicellata De Wild.
- Cynometra pervilleana Baill.
- Cynometra phaselocarpa (B.Heyne) J.F.Macbr.
- Cynometra plurijuga (Merr. & L.M.Perry) Rados.
- Cynometra polyandra Roxb.
- Cynometra portoricensis Krug & Urb.
- Cynometra psilogyne (Harms) Rados.
- Cynometra ramiflora L.
- Cynometra retusa Britton & Rose
- Cynometra rosea (K.Schum.) Rados.
- Cynometra roseiflora W.E.Cooper
- Cynometra sakalava Du Puy & R.Rabev.
- Cynometra sampathkumaraniana Sanjappa, Sringesw. & Dalavi
- Cynometra sanagaensis Aubrév.
- Cynometra schefferi (K.Schum.) Rados.
- Cynometra schlechteri Harms
- Cynometra schottiana Hochr.
- Cynometra sessiliflora Harms
- Cynometra simplicifolia Harms
- Cynometra sphaerocarpa Pittier
- Cynometra steenisii (Meeuwen) Rados.
- Cynometra stenopetala Dwyer
- Cynometra steyermarkii Rados.
- Cynometra suaheliensis (Taub.) Baker f.
- Cynometra travancorica Bedd.
- Cynometra trinitensis Oliv.
- Cynometra tumbesiana Rados.
- Cynometra ulugurensis Harms
- Cynometra vestita (A.C.Sm.) Rados.
- Cynometra vitiensis Rados.
- Cynometra vogelii Hook.f.
- Cynometra warburgii Harms
- Cynometra webberi Baker f.
- Cynometra yokotae Kaneh.
- Cynometra zeylanica Kosterm.
