= Cynometra cubensis =

Conservation status
- Least Concern (IUCN 3.1)

Scientific classification
- Kingdom: Plantae
- Clade: Tracheophytes
- Clade: Angiosperms
- Clade: Eudicots
- Clade: Rosids
- Order: Fabales
- Family: Fabaceae
- Genus: Cynometra
- Species: C. cubensis

Binomial name
- Cynometra cubensis A.Rich.

Species of legume

Cynometra cubensis is a species of plant in the family Fabaceae. It is found only in western Cuba. It grows in mesophyllous and microphyllous semi-deciduous forest, anthropogenic savanna, gallery forest, and dry thorny scrub on serpentine substrate from 10 to 400 meters elevation. It is threatened by habitat loss and fragmentation from invasive plants and soil erosion.
