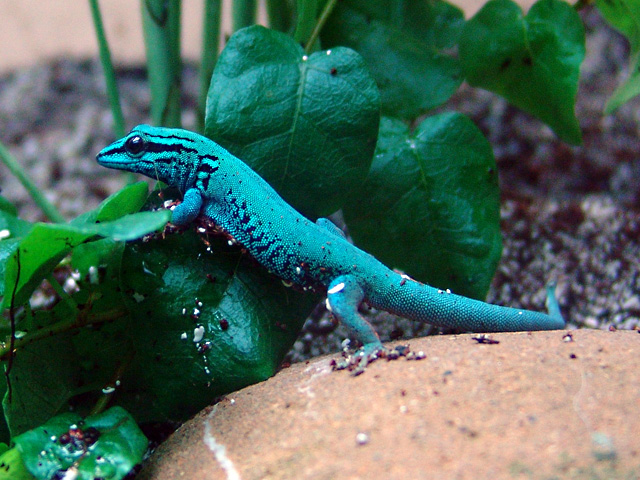
- Male
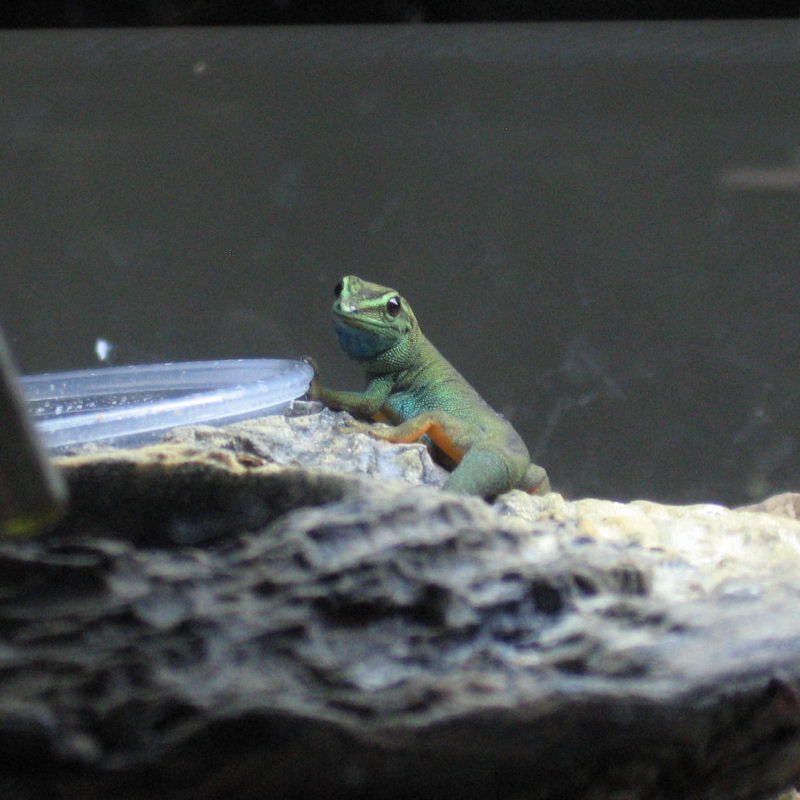
- Female

Conservation status
- Critically Endangered (IUCN 3.1)
- CITES Appendix I

Scientific classification
- Kingdom: Animalia
- Phylum: Chordata
- Class: Reptilia
- Order: Squamata
- Suborder: Gekkota
- Family: Gekkonidae
- Genus: Lygodactylus
- Species: L. williamsi

Binomial name
- Lygodactylus williamsi Loveridge, 1952
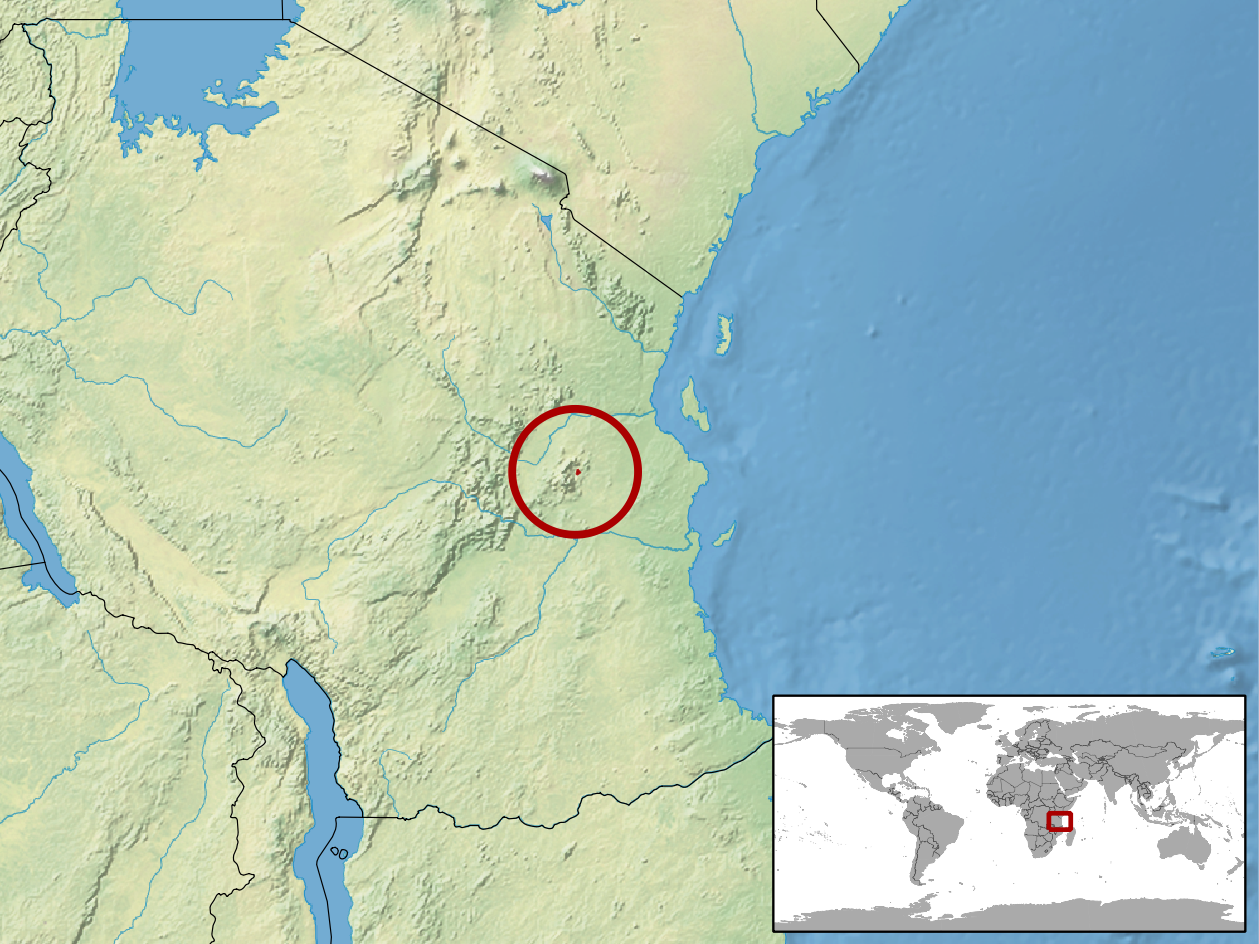
- Lygodactylus williamsi is restricted to a few square kilometers of Tanzania.

= Lygodactylus williamsi =

Electric blue gecko

Species of lizard

Lygodactylus williamsi is a critically endangered species of lizard in the family Gekkonidae. The species is endemic to a small area of Tanzania. Common names include turquoise dwarf gecko, William's dwarf gecko and, in the pet trade, electric blue gecko or electric blue day gecko.

Illegally wild-caught specimens are widely sold in the pet trade, often falsely promoted as captive-bred. Although L. williamsi breeds in captivity, the young require a lot of specific care, making large-scale breeding difficult. There is some specialist breeding, with one very large breeder claiming to have produced about a thousand individuals as of 2017, but no large-scale professional breeding. A captive breeding project and studbook was initiated by EAZA-registered zoos in 2013.

L. williamsi, as a species, was placed under EU Appendix B protection (December 2014) and EU Appendix A protection (January 2017), and given CITES Appendix I protection in January 2017, as well. The gecko may not be kept or sold in the EU without documentation and permits, renewable every three years, and geckos must now be registered. Similar restrictions apply in many other jurisdictions.

== Population ==
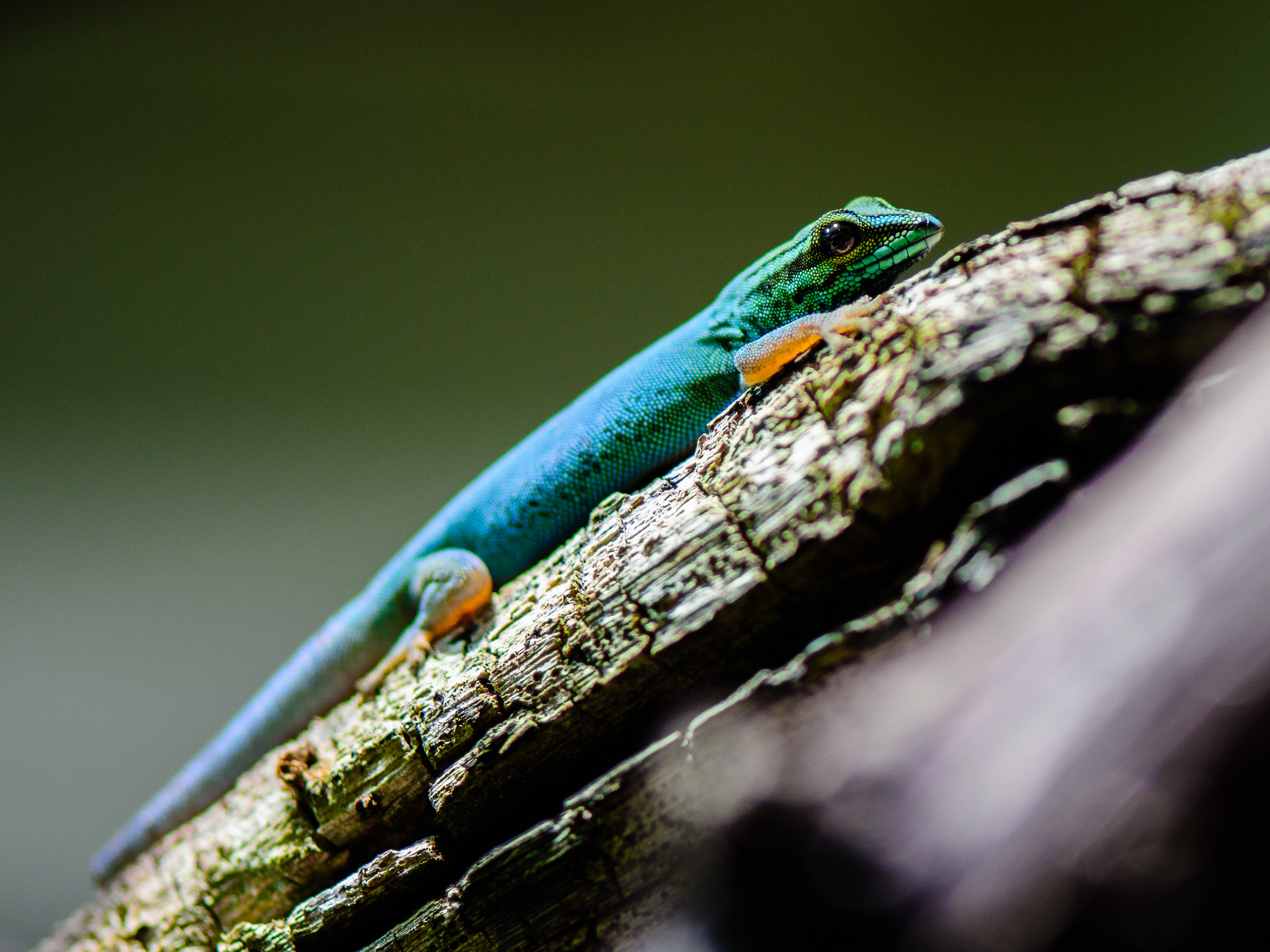
At the Zürich Zoo

The survival of L. williamsi is mostly threatened by (entirely illegal) collection for the international pet trade. It is critically endangered and the population is thought to be declining rapidly.

Although trade in wild-caught turquoise day geckos is illegal, wild-caught geckos are commonly sold in pet shops. It is estimated that between December 2004 and July 2009, at least 32,310 to 42,610 geckos were taken by one collecting group, ~15% of the wild population at the time.

=== Geographic range ===
L. williamsi is only found in 8 km^{2} (3.1 mi^{2}) of the Kimboza Forest, Ruvu Forest Reserve, Mbagalala and Muhalama at an altitude of 170–480 m (560–1,570 ft). These are located at the foothills of the Uluguru Mountains in eastern Tanzania.

The subpopulation in Kimboza Forest Reserve was estimated at 150,000 adults in 2009. The size of the remaining subpopulations is unknown, but their size is not thought to contribute significantly to the total population. The two known sites outside protected areas are tiny: one consists of 14 Pandanus trees (the rest has been cleared for banana plantations) and the other is equally close to disappearing.

== Habitat ==
In the wild, the turquoise day gecko lives exclusively on the (redlisted endemic) screwpine, Pandanus rabaiensis, mostly in the leaf crown. It only lives on large trees, those with leaves more than 1 m (3.3 ft) long. A single leaf crown will typically contain a single individual, or an adult male, an adult female, and juveniles. It eats small insects and fruit and drinks water from leaves. It is also fond of nectar.

=== Habitat loss ===
Collectors commonly cut down screwpine trees to reach the geckos living in the leaf crest, destroying the gecko's habitat. Many geckos are thought to die while being shipped to market. The pet trade is likely a worse threat than habitat loss. The gecko is now restricted to the forest in Tanzania and is at risk of extinction in the wild as the forests are cleared.

L. williamsi's tropical forest habitat is also shrinking and fragmenting. Neither of the Catchment Forest Reserves where it occurs is well-protected. The forest is seriously threatened by pet collectors, clearing for farmland, illegal logging, increasingly frequent fires, mining of rubies, tourmaline, rhodolite, gold and dolomite and limestone from outcrops on which the screwpines grow. Invasive trees such as Cedrela are also a threat. There is little forest left unaffected.

== Appearance ==
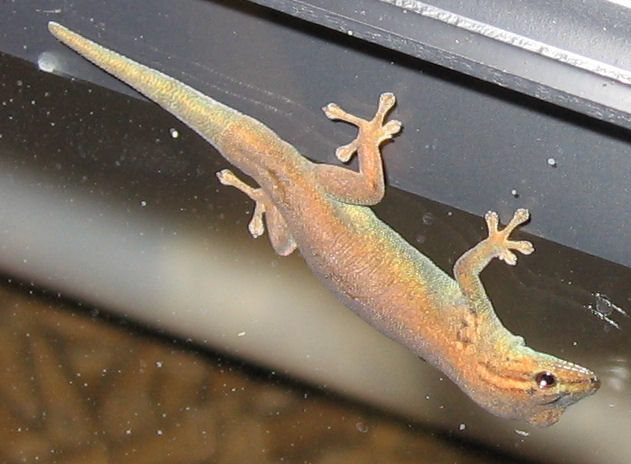
Females and non-dominant males may be more brown, bronze or green (males are more blue, grey, or black).

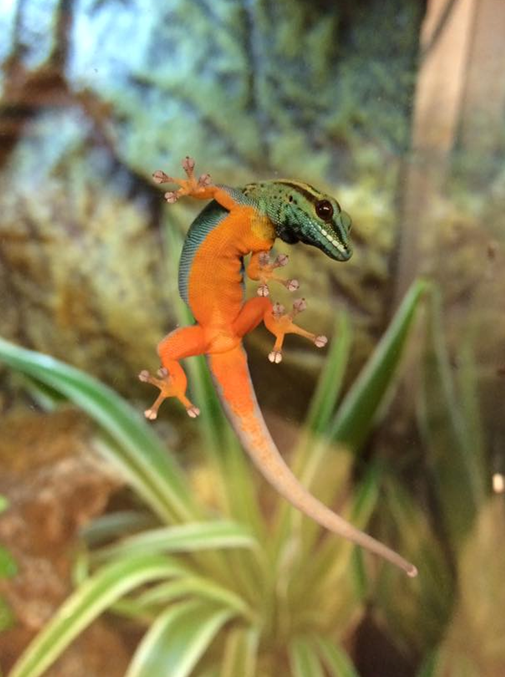
Both sexes can have orange undersides.

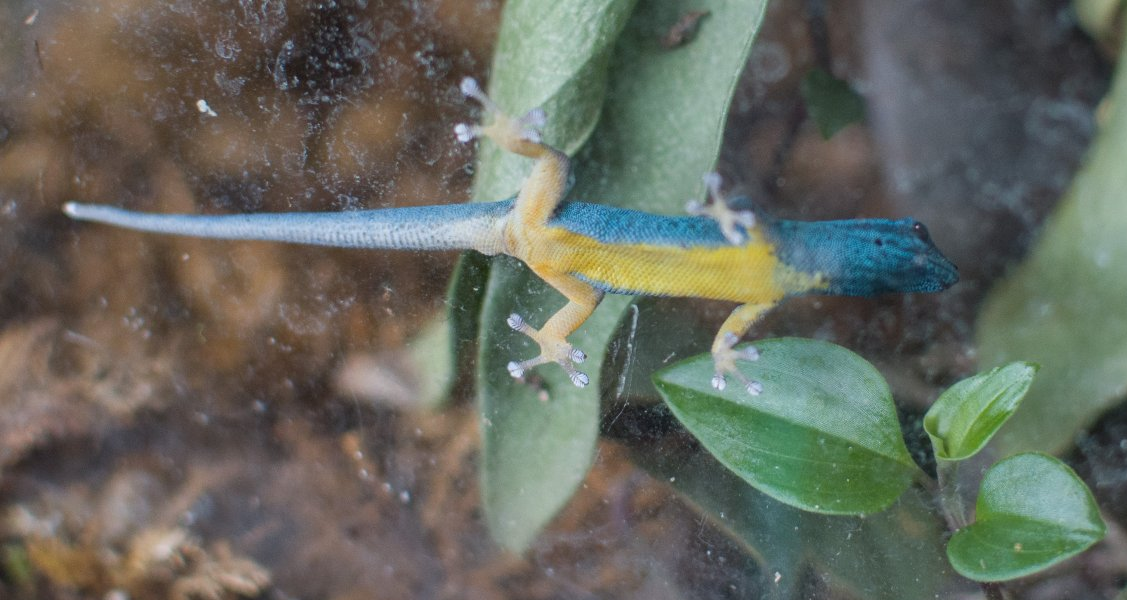
Both sexes can have yellow undersides.

Adult snout-vent length (SVL) is 5 to 8 cm (2.0 to 3.1 in). Males of L. williamsi are bright blue with heavy black throat stripes, visible preanal pores, and hemipenile bulges. Females range from brown or bronze to bright green, and have little to no black on the throat. Females can easily be confused with juvenile or socially suppressed males that are also green, sometimes with a bluish cast. Juveniles have colouring similar to females, but more orange in tone. The underside of both sexes is orange to yellow, often with areas of both colours.

Colours of individuals vary according to mood and temperature. Males may range from black or gray to brilliant electric blue. Females may range from dark brown to brilliant green with turquoise highlights.

A well-illustrated Lygodactylus spp. identification guide has been published online by CITES, largely for the use of customs officers (illegal shipments of these geckos are often intentionally mislabelled).

== Behavior ==
Like all geckos of the genera Lygodactylus and Phelsuma, L. williamsi is diurnal. It is bold, active, and social. Males are territorial, and do not generally tolerate the presence of other males. Social gestures include lateral flattening, puffing out of the throat patch, head shaking and head bobbing, and tail-wagging.

== Reproduction ==
Males of L. williamsi court females with lateral flattening, puffing out of the throat pouch, and head bobbing. Two to three weeks after copulation, the female lays a clutch of 1 or 2 pea-sized white, hard-shelled eggs which are glued to a surface in a secure, hidden location. Eggs hatch in 60 to 90 days.

== Etymology ==
The specific name, williamsi, given to the gecko by British zoologist Arthur Loveridge, honours American herpetologist Ernest Edward Williams.
