= Cynometra falcata =

Conservation status
- Least Concern (IUCN 3.1)

Scientific classification
- Kingdom: Plantae
- Clade: Tracheophytes
- Clade: Angiosperms
- Clade: Eudicots
- Clade: Rosids
- Order: Fabales
- Family: Fabaceae
- Genus: Cynometra
- Species: C. falcata

Binomial name
- Cynometra falcata A.Gray

Species of legume

Cynometra falcata is a species of plant in the family Fabaceae. It is found only in Fiji.
