= Cynometra longipedicellata =

Conservation status
- Critically Endangered (IUCN 3.1)

Scientific classification
- Kingdom: Plantae
- Clade: Tracheophytes
- Clade: Angiosperms
- Clade: Eudicots
- Clade: Rosids
- Order: Fabales
- Family: Fabaceae
- Genus: Cynometra
- Species: C. longipedicellata

Binomial name
- Cynometra longipedicellata Harms

Species of legume

Cynometra longipedicellata is a species of plant in the family Fabaceae. It is found only in Tanzania.

== Taxonomy ==
According to Aleksandar Radosavljevic (2019), Cynometra longipedicellata along with other mainland tropical African (but not all) species of the genus Cynometra should be excluded from the genus and will be transferred to a new as yet un-named genus in the future.
