= Cynometra bourdillonii =

Conservation status
- Endangered (IUCN 3.1)

Scientific classification
- Kingdom: Plantae
- Clade: Tracheophytes
- Clade: Angiosperms
- Clade: Eudicots
- Clade: Rosids
- Order: Fabales
- Family: Fabaceae
- Genus: Cynometra
- Species: C. bourdillonii

Binomial name
- Cynometra bourdillonii Gamble

Species of legume

Cynometra bourdillonii is a species of flowering plant in the family Fabaceae. It is an evergreen tree which grows up to 15 meters tall. It is native to the Western Ghats of southwestern India, where it is known from South Kanara in Karnataka and the Agastyamalai range in Kerala. It grows in lowland rain forest. It is threatened by timber harvesting and habitat loss from agricultural expansion.
