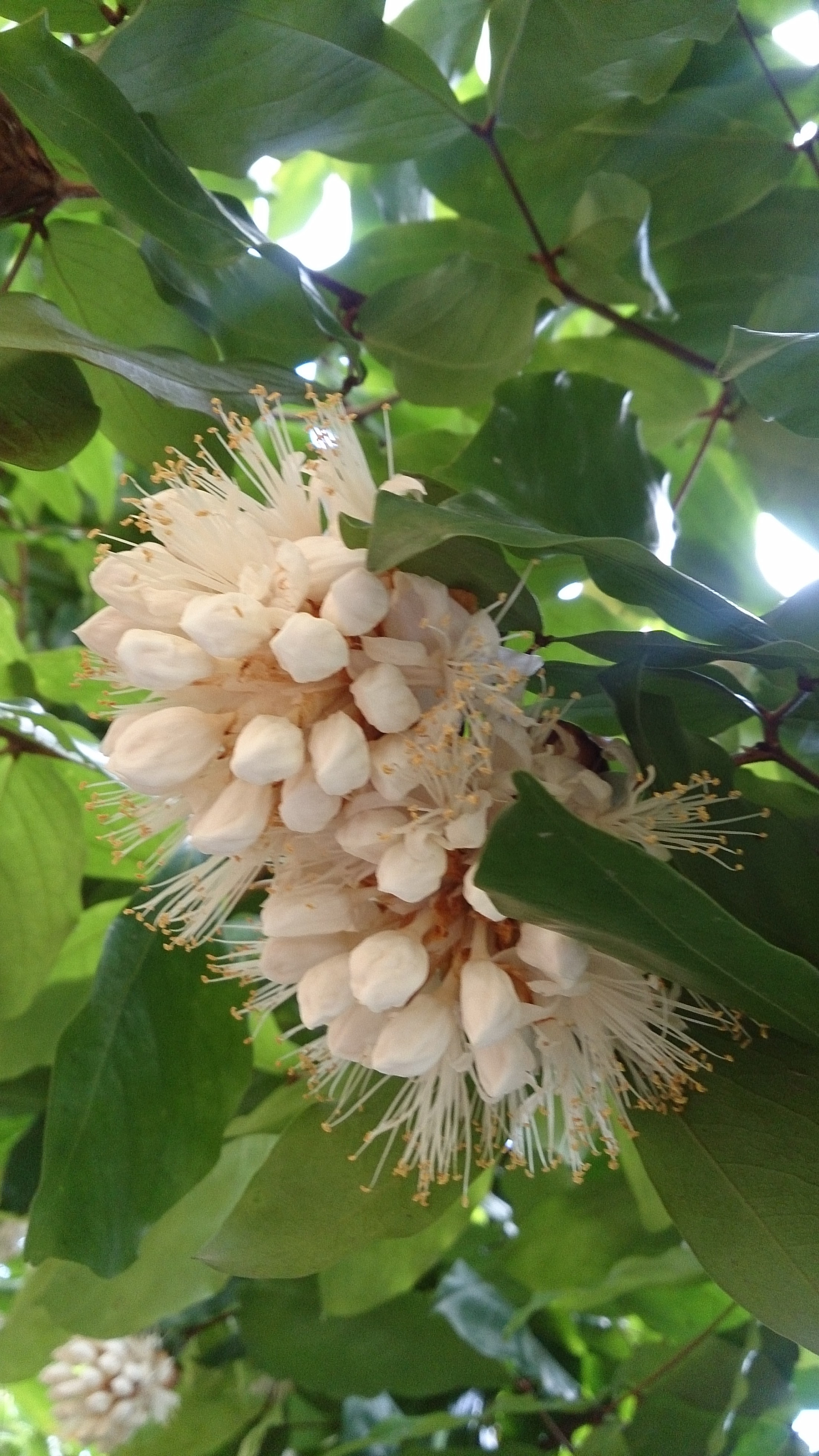

Scientific classification
- Kingdom: Plantae
- Clade: Embryophytes
- Clade: Tracheophytes
- Clade: Spermatophytes
- Clade: Angiosperms
- Clade: Eudicots
- Clade: Rosids
- Order: Fabales
- Family: Fabaceae
- Genus: Cynometra
- Species: C. browneoides

Binomial name
- Cynometra browneoides (Harms) Rados. (2019)

Synonyms
- Maniltoa browneoides Harms (1902); Maniltoa gemmipara Scheff. ex Backer (1908); Pseudocynometra browneoides (Harms) Kuntze (1903)

= Cynometra browneoides =

Species of plant

Cynometra browneoides is a species of flowering plant in the pea family (Fabaceae). Common names include handkerchief tree and pokok sapu tangan. It is a tree native to New Guinea. It has been introduced to Java and Sumatra.

It can grow from 5 m to 15 m. The stem is straight, round, brown and sympodial. Its leaf is green, pinnate, elongate with smooth margin, and pointed at both ends, with dimension of 7–14 cm long, 3–8 cm wide with 1–1,5 cm long petiole. Its root develops from the radicle and is brownish white. The leaves, fruits, and bark of this plant contain saponin, flavonoid, and polyphenol.
