= Cynometra vestita =

Conservation status
- Least Concern (IUCN 3.1)

Scientific classification
- Kingdom: Plantae
- Clade: Tracheophytes
- Clade: Angiosperms
- Clade: Eudicots
- Clade: Rosids
- Order: Fabales
- Family: Fabaceae
- Genus: Cynometra
- Species: C. vestita

Binomial name
- Cynometra vestita (A.C.Sm.) Rados. (2019)

Synonyms
- Maniltoa vestita A.C.Sm. (1950)

Species of legume

Cynometra vestita is a species of plant in the family Fabaceae. It is a tree found only in Fiji, on the islands of Viti Levu and Vanua Levu.
