= Cynometra suaheliensis =

Conservation status
- Vulnerable (IUCN 2.3)

Scientific classification
- Kingdom: Plantae
- Clade: Tracheophytes
- Clade: Angiosperms
- Clade: Eudicots
- Clade: Rosids
- Order: Fabales
- Family: Fabaceae
- Genus: Cynometra
- Species: C. suaheliensis

Binomial name
- Cynometra suaheliensis (Taub.) Bak.f.

Species of legume

Cynometra suaheliensis is a species of plant in the family Fabaceae. It is found in Kenya and Tanzania.

== Taxonomy ==
According to Aleksandar Radosavljevic (2019), Cynometra suaheliensis along with other mainland tropical African (but not all) species of the genus Cynometra should be excluded from the genus and will be transferred to a new as yet un-named genus in the future.
