= Cynometra minor =

Conservation status
- Least Concern (IUCN 3.1)

Scientific classification
- Kingdom: Plantae
- Clade: Tracheophytes
- Clade: Angiosperms
- Clade: Eudicots
- Clade: Rosids
- Order: Fabales
- Family: Fabaceae
- Genus: Cynometra
- Species: C. minor

Binomial name
- Cynometra minor (A.C.Sm.) Rados.

Synonyms
- Maniltoa minor A.C.Sm. (1942)

Species of legume

Cynometra minor is a species of flowering plant in the family Fabaceae. It is a tree which grows 7–18 metres tall. It is endemic to Fiji, where it is native to the islands of Viti Levu, Ovalau, Kadavu, Koro, Mamanuca, Matuku, and Moala. It grows in lowland moist forests and dry forests below 250 metres elevation.

The species was first described as Maniltoa minor by Albert Charles Smith in 1942. In 2019 Aleksandar Radosavljevic placed the species in genus Cynometra as C. minor.
