= Cynometra rosea =

Scientific classification
- Kingdom: Plantae
- Clade: Tracheophytes
- Clade: Angiosperms
- Clade: Eudicots
- Clade: Rosids
- Order: Fabales
- Family: Fabaceae
- Genus: Cynometra
- Species: C. rosea

Binomial name
- Cynometra rosea (K.Schum.) Rados. (2019)

Synonyms
- Maniltoa rosea (K.Schum.) Meeuwen (1970); Maniltoa urophylla Harms (1917); Schizosiphon roseus K.Schum. (1889)

Species of legume

Cynometra rosea is a species of flowering plants in the family Fabaceae. It is a tree endemic to New Guinea. It belongs to the subfamily Detarioideae.
