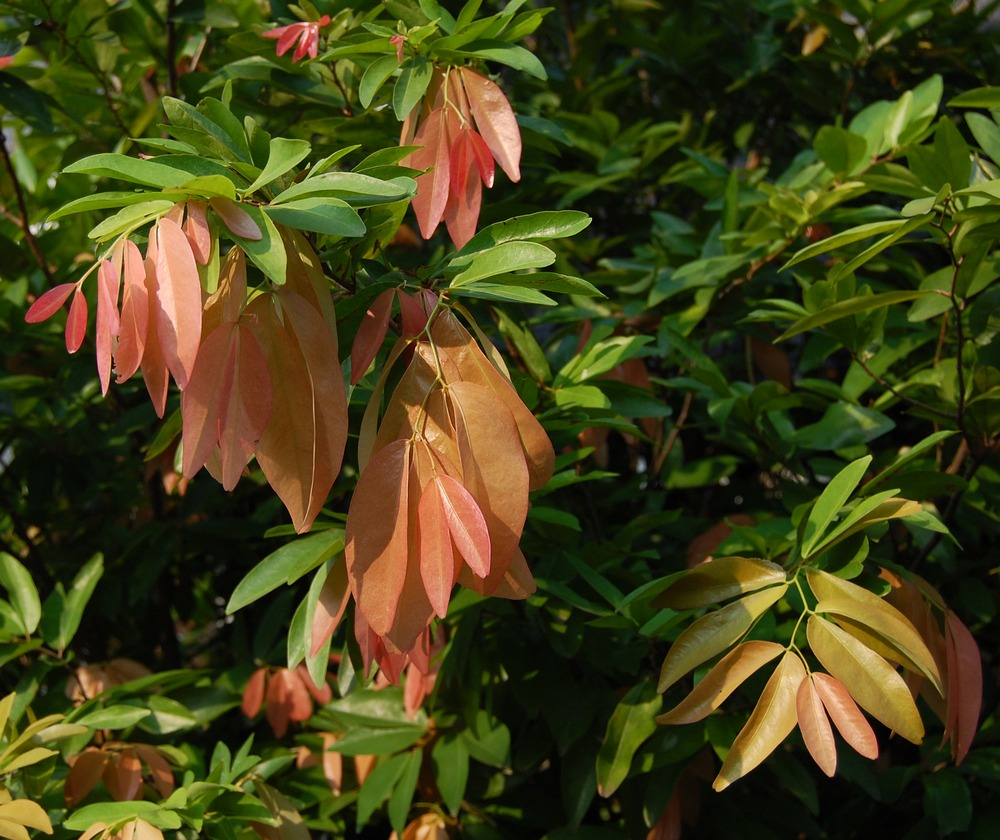
- Leaves

Scientific classification
- Kingdom: Plantae
- Clade: Embryophytes
- Clade: Tracheophytes
- Clade: Spermatophytes
- Clade: Angiosperms
- Clade: Eudicots
- Clade: Rosids
- Order: Fabales
- Family: Fabaceae
- Genus: Cynometra
- Species: C. cauliflora

Binomial name
- Cynometra cauliflora L.

= Cynometra cauliflora =

Species of legume

Cynometra cauliflora is a small, cauliflorous tree with a thick, heavily branched stem, and rather small flowers, about 1.2 cm (0.5 in) across, that appear on the stem in clusters. It is known in Indonesian as namu-namu, after the flattened, crescent shaped pods, which look similar to the Indonesian pastry, namu-namu. In the city of Ternate, it is called namo-namo, and ñam-ñam in the Maldives. It is a species of the genus Cynometra, native to Malaysia, and found mainly in northern peninsular Malaysia.

== Foliage ==
Each leaf is made up of 2 leaflets, which if not examined closely may appear as two leaves. The leaflet is asymmetrical in shape measuring 5–15 cm (2–6 in) long and 2.5–7.5 cm (1–3 in) wide. They are glossy and smooth, dark green with pale green undersides, and are a rosy pink when young.

== Fruits ==
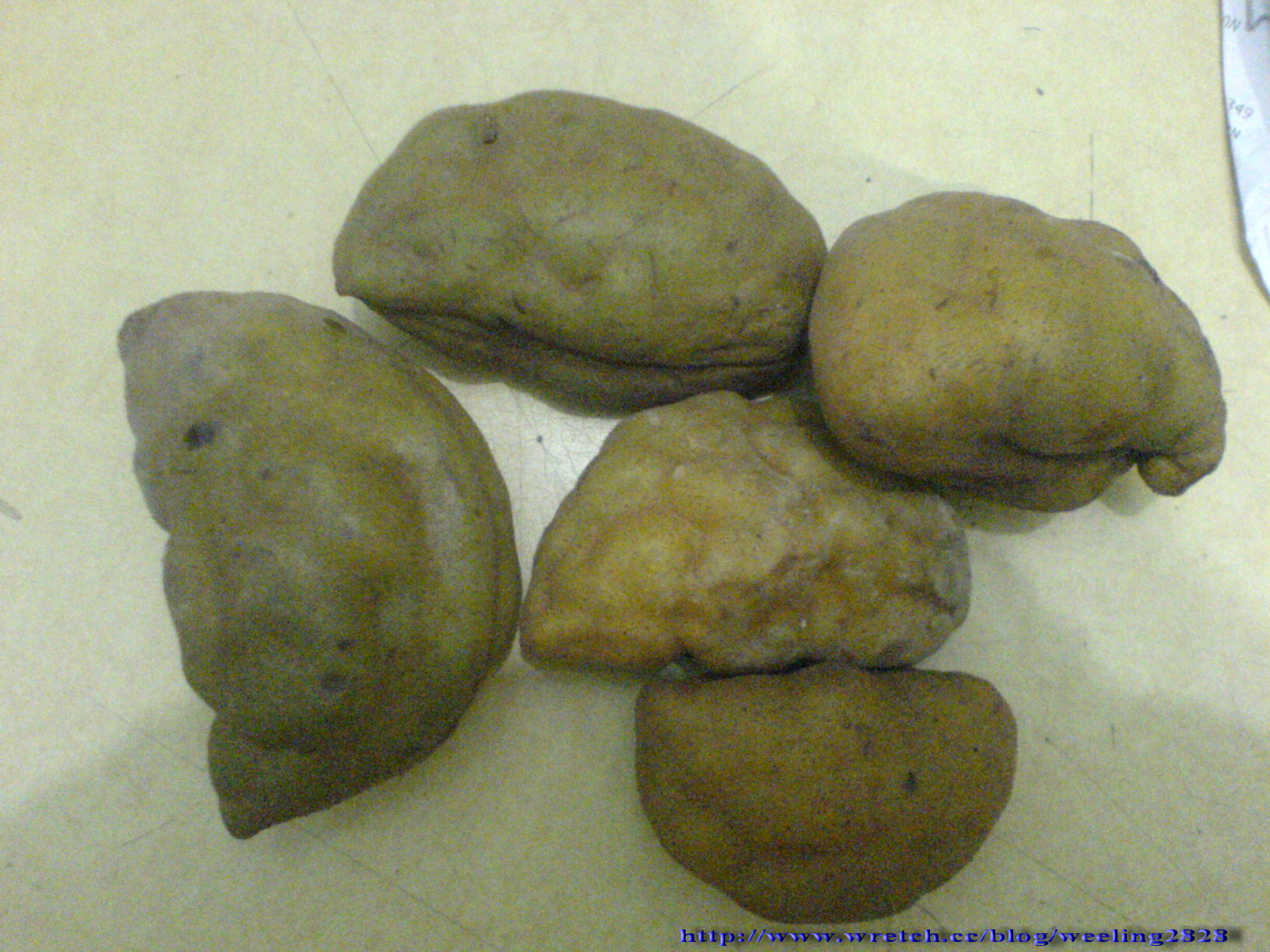
The fruit of Cynometra cauliflora.

The fruits are kidney-shaped, 5–10 cm (2–4 in) long and 5 cm (2 in). The pod does not split open readily, but a line is visible along the fruit and divides it into two. The texture of the skin is coriaceous and uneven, colored a pale greenish/yellow to brown. The pod is edible, with aromatic and juicy yellow pulp, and relatively large seeds.

== Propagation ==
The tree is usually grown from seed, although it can be propagated by budding, approach grafting and other methods.
