= Cynometra gillmanii =

Conservation status
- Endangered (IUCN 3.1)

Scientific classification
- Kingdom: Plantae
- Clade: Tracheophytes
- Clade: Angiosperms
- Clade: Eudicots
- Clade: Rosids
- Order: Fabales
- Family: Fabaceae
- Genus: Cynometra
- Species: C. gillmanii

Binomial name
- Cynometra gillmanii Leon

Species of legume

Cynometra gillmanii is a species of plant in the family Fabaceae. It is found only in Lindi Region of Tanzania. It is threatened by habitat loss.

== Taxonomy ==
According to Aleksandar Radosavljevic (2019), Cynometra gillmanii along with other mainland tropical African (but not all) species of the genus Cynometra should be excluded from the genus and will be transferred to a new as yet un-named genus in the future.
