= Cynometra webberi =

Conservation status
- Near Threatened (IUCN 3.1)

Scientific classification
- Kingdom: Plantae
- Clade: Tracheophytes
- Clade: Angiosperms
- Clade: Eudicots
- Clade: Rosids
- Order: Fabales
- Family: Fabaceae
- Genus: Cynometra
- Species: C. webberi

Binomial name
- Cynometra webberi Bak.f.

Species of legume

Cynometra webberi is a species of plant in the family Fabaceae. It is found in Kenya and Tanzania.

== Taxonomy ==
According to Aleksandar Radosavljevic (2019), Cynometra webberi along with other mainland tropical African (but not all) species of the genus Cynometra should be excluded from the genus and will be transferred to a new as yet un-named genus in the future.
