= Cynometra filifera =

Conservation status
- Endangered (IUCN 3.1)

Scientific classification
- Kingdom: Plantae
- Clade: Tracheophytes
- Clade: Angiosperms
- Clade: Eudicots
- Clade: Rosids
- Order: Fabales
- Family: Fabaceae
- Genus: Cynometra
- Species: C. filifera

Binomial name
- Cynometra filifera Harms

Species of legume

Cynometra filifera is a species of plant in the family Fabaceae. It is found only in Lindi Region of Tanzania.

== Taxonomy ==
According to Aleksandar Radosavljevic (2019), Cynometra filifera along with other mainland tropical African (but not all) species of the genus Cynometra should be excluded from the genus and will be transferred to a new as yet un-named genus in the future.
