= Cynometra vitiensis =

Conservation status
- Least Concern (IUCN 3.1)

Scientific classification
- Kingdom: Plantae
- Clade: Tracheophytes
- Clade: Angiosperms
- Clade: Eudicots
- Clade: Rosids
- Order: Fabales
- Family: Fabaceae
- Genus: Cynometra
- Species: C. vitiensis

Binomial name
- Cynometra vitiensis Rados. (2019)

Synonyms
- Maniltoa floribunda A.C.Sm. (1950)

Species of legume

Cynometra vitiensis is a species of flowering plant in the family Fabaceae. It is a large tree which grows from 15 to 23 metres tall. It is endemic to Fiji, where it is native to the islands of Viti Levu, Ovalau, Kadavu, Lakeba, and Vanua Balavu. It grows in dense or open moist forest and dry forest and rocky coasts from sea level to 600 metres elevation.

The species was first described as Maniltoa floribunda by Albert Charles Smith in 1950. In 1950 Aleksandar Radosavljevic placed the species in genus Cynometra as C. vitiensis.
