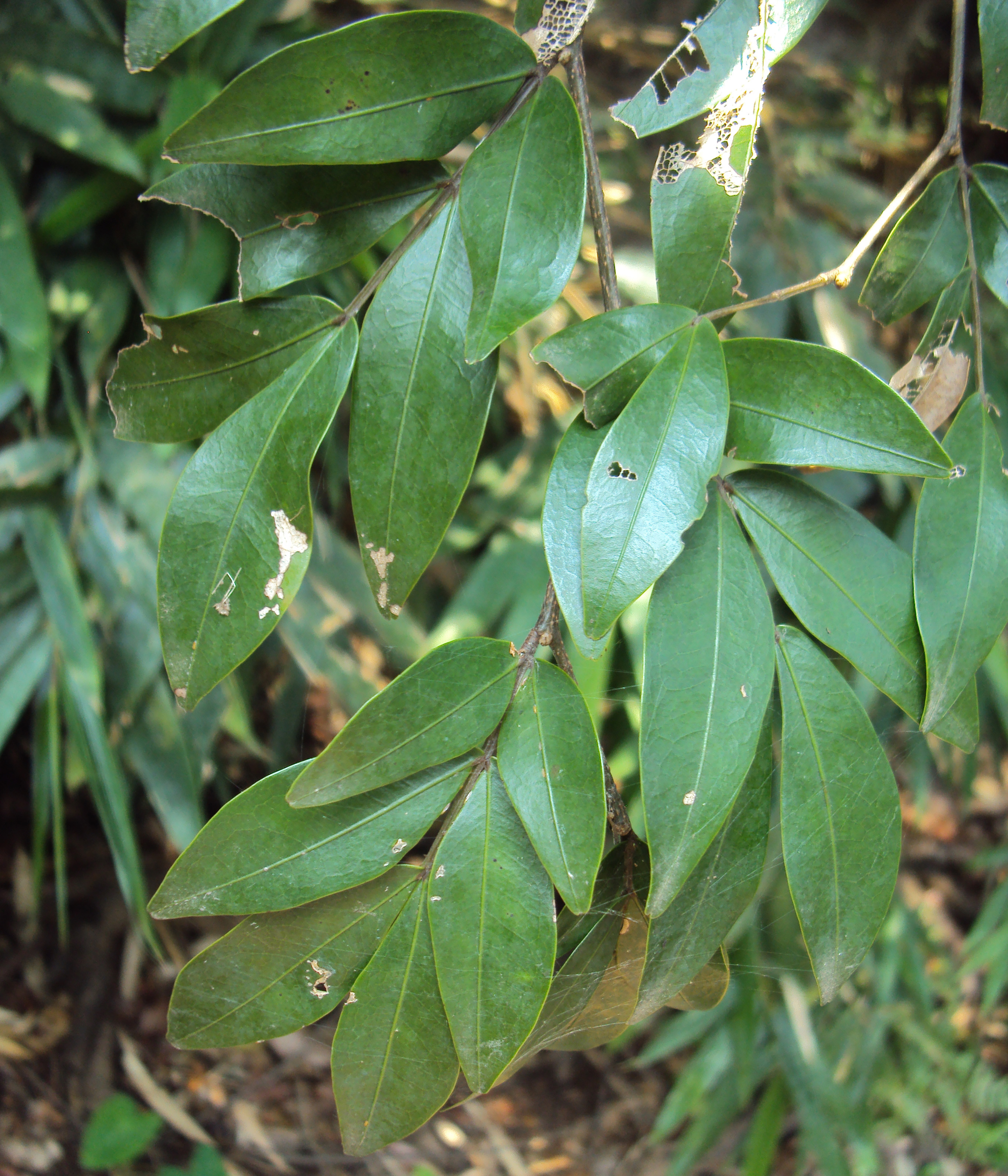
- Leaves

Conservation status
- Endangered (IUCN 3.1)

Scientific classification
- Kingdom: Plantae
- Clade: Tracheophytes
- Clade: Angiosperms
- Clade: Eudicots
- Clade: Rosids
- Order: Fabales
- Family: Fabaceae
- Genus: Cynometra
- Species: C. beddomei

Binomial name
- Cynometra beddomei Prain

= Cynometra beddomei =

Species of legume

Cynometra beddomei is a species of tree in the family Fabaceae, described from a single tree in the Western Ghats of Kerala in southwestern India. In 1998, it was declared extinct as it had never been seen again since 1870.

Trees of the species have subsequently been identified in several parts of Kerala and southern Karnataka. This tree is found in streamside submontane evergreen and semi-evergreen forests from 700 to 1,000 metres elevation. The IUCN Status was updated to reflect this in 2020. It is threatened by habitat loss.

The species was first described by David Prain in 1897.
