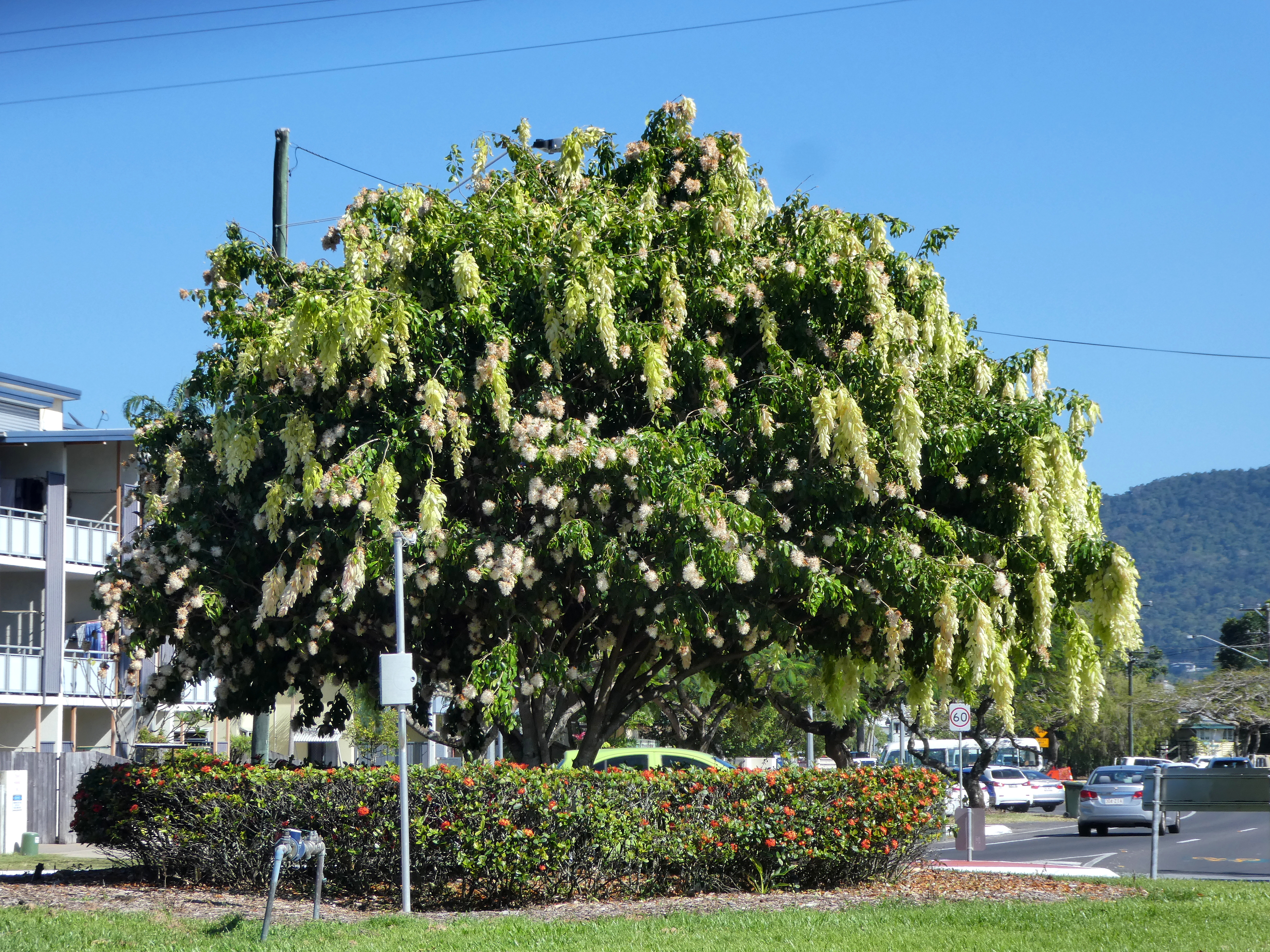

Scientific classification
- Kingdom: Plantae
- Clade: Tracheophytes
- Clade: Angiosperms
- Clade: Eudicots
- Clade: Rosids
- Order: Fabales
- Family: Fabaceae
- Genus: Cynometra
- Species: C. lenticellata

Binomial name
- Cynometra lenticellata (C.T.White) Rados. (2019)

Subspecies
- Cynometra lenticellata var. lenticellata; Cynometra lenticellata var. villosa (Verdc.) Rados.

Synonyms
- Maniltoa lenticellata C.T.White (1927)

= Cynometra lenticellata =

Cascading bean

Species of legume

Cynometra lenticellata is a flowering tropical tree in the family Fabaceae. It is native to tropical semi-deciduous rainforest and gallery forests in northern Queensland, some of the Torres Strait Islands, and New Guinea. Common names include: silk handkerchief tree, cascading bean, and native handkerchief tree.

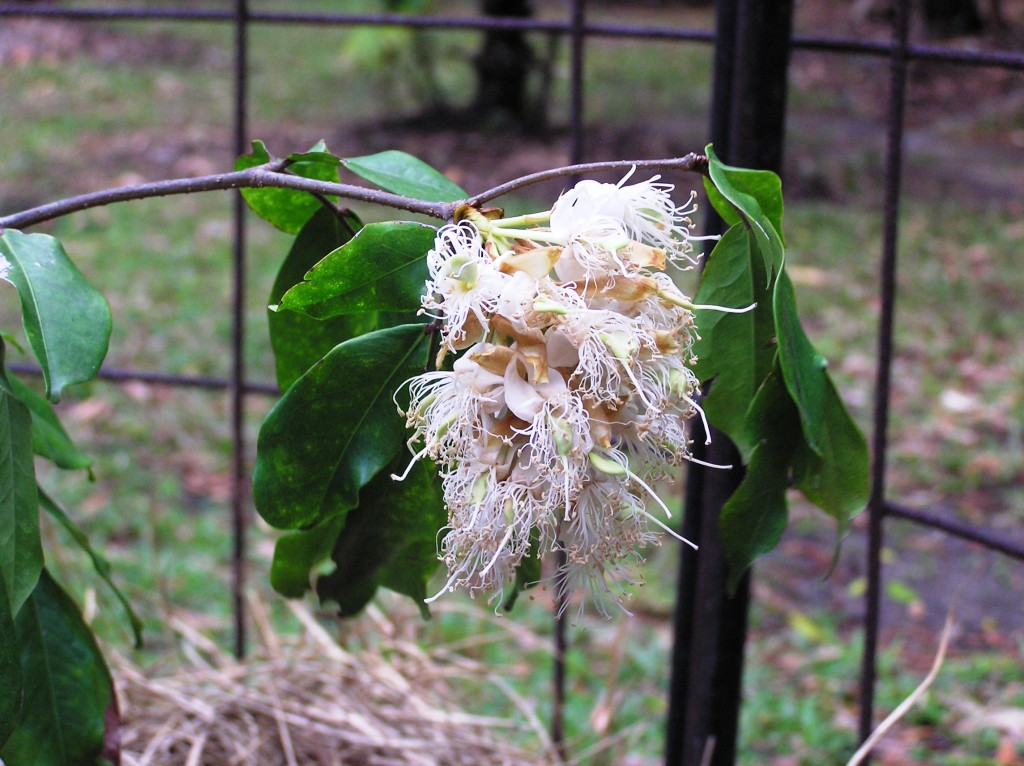
Maniltoa lenticellata flower

Cynometra lenticellata can grow up to 22 m (72 ft) tall but, more commonly, only reaches 10–12 m (33–39 ft). It has compound leaves with 2-4 pairs of leaflets. New leaves are folded inside dull red bracts and then released in a spectacular cascade of white foliage. The fruity-scented flowers which appear in north Queensland in September to October have 3 to 5 white-cream petals, and may be pollinated by marsupials or bats. They produce a brown pod 25–70 mm long by 18-50mm containing one brown seed in November to March. It is a favoured garden tree. Cynometra lenticellata var. villosa Verdc. from New Guinea differs from var. lenticellata in having ovaries with dense, persistent hairs.
