= Cynometra engleri =

Conservation status
- Endangered (IUCN 3.1)

Scientific classification
- Kingdom: Plantae
- Clade: Tracheophytes
- Clade: Angiosperms
- Clade: Eudicots
- Clade: Rosids
- Order: Fabales
- Family: Fabaceae
- Genus: Cynometra
- Species: C. engleri

Binomial name
- Cynometra engleri Harms

Species of legume

Cynometra engleri is a species of plant in the family Fabaceae. It is found only in Tanzania.

== Taxonomy ==
According to Aleksandar Radosavljevic (2019), Cynometra engleri along with other mainland tropical African (but not all) species of the genus Cynometra should be excluded from the genus and will be transferred to a new as yet un-named genus in the future.
