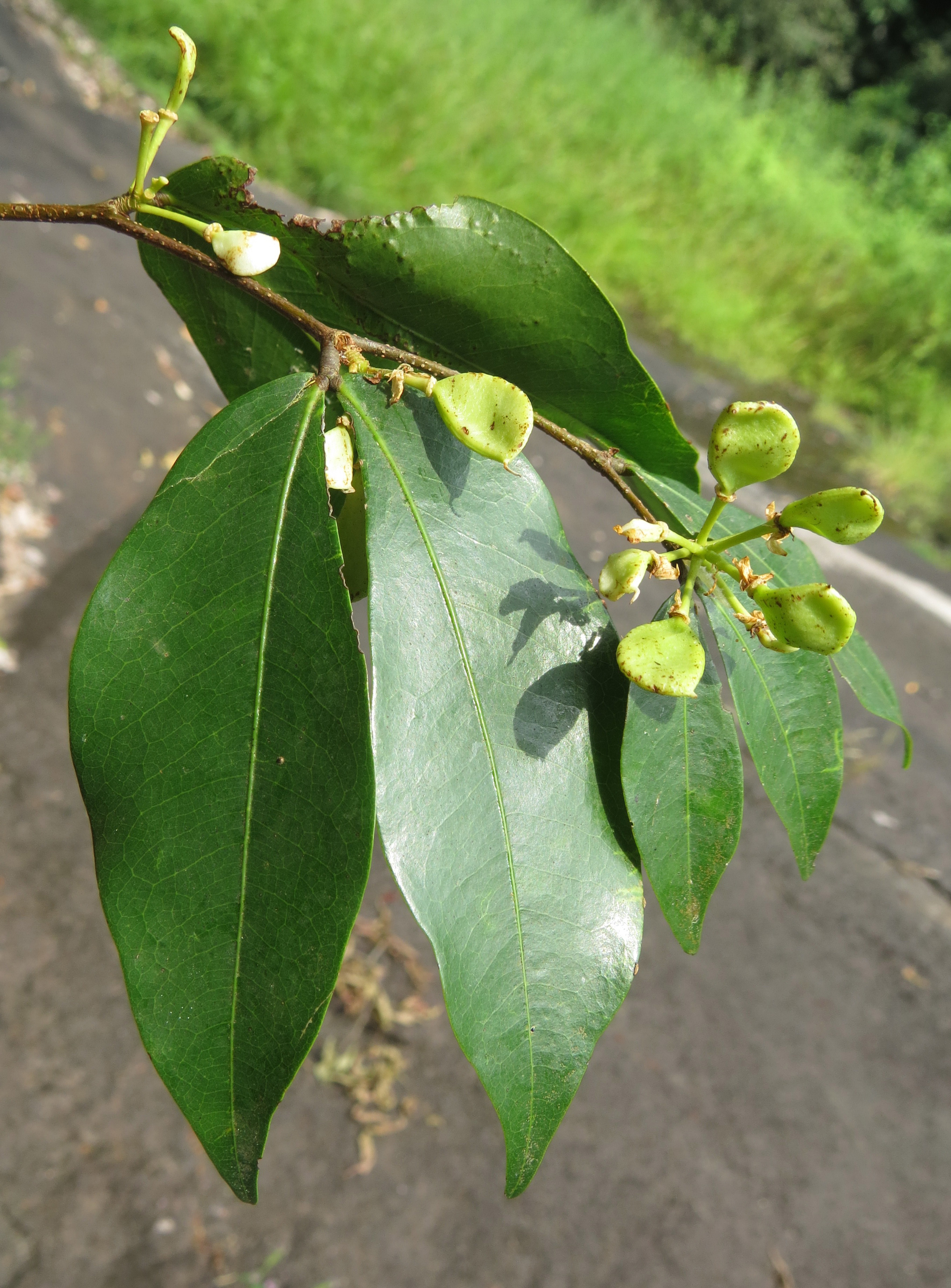
- Leaves and fruits

Conservation status
- Endangered (IUCN 2.3)

Scientific classification
- Kingdom: Plantae
- Clade: Tracheophytes
- Clade: Angiosperms
- Clade: Eudicots
- Clade: Rosids
- Order: Fabales
- Family: Fabaceae
- Genus: Cynometra
- Species: C. travancorica

Binomial name
- Cynometra travancorica Bedd.

= Cynometra travancorica =

Species of legume

Cynometra travancorica is a species of flowering plant in the family Fabaceae. It is a tree endemic to the Western Ghats of Karnataka, Kerala, and Tamil Nadu states in southwestern India. It grows in lowland evergreen moist forest on rocky slopes. It is threatened by habitat loss.
