= Cynometra brachyrrhachis =

Conservation status
- Vulnerable (IUCN 3.1)

Scientific classification
- Kingdom: Plantae
- Clade: Tracheophytes
- Clade: Angiosperms
- Clade: Eudicots
- Clade: Rosids
- Order: Fabales
- Family: Fabaceae
- Genus: Cynometra
- Species: C. brachyrrhachis

Binomial name
- Cynometra brachyrrhachis Harms

Species of legume

Cynometra brachyrrhachis is a species of plant in the family Fabaceae. It is found only in Tanzania. It is threatened by habitat loss.

== Taxonomy ==
According to Aleksandar Radosavljevic (2019), Cynometra brachyrrhachis along with other mainland tropical African (but not all) species of the genus Cynometra should be excluded from the genus and will be transferred to a new as yet un-named genus in the future.
