= Cynometra inaequifolia =

Conservation status
- Vulnerable (IUCN 2.3)

Scientific classification
- Kingdom: Plantae
- Clade: Tracheophytes
- Clade: Angiosperms
- Clade: Eudicots
- Clade: Rosids
- Order: Fabales
- Family: Fabaceae
- Genus: Cynometra
- Species: C. inaequifolia

Binomial name
- Cynometra inaequifolia A.Gray

Species of legume

Cynometra inaequifolia is a species of plant in the family Fabaceae. It is found in Malaysia, the Philippines, and possibly Thailand. It is threatened by habitat loss.
