= Kimboza Forest =

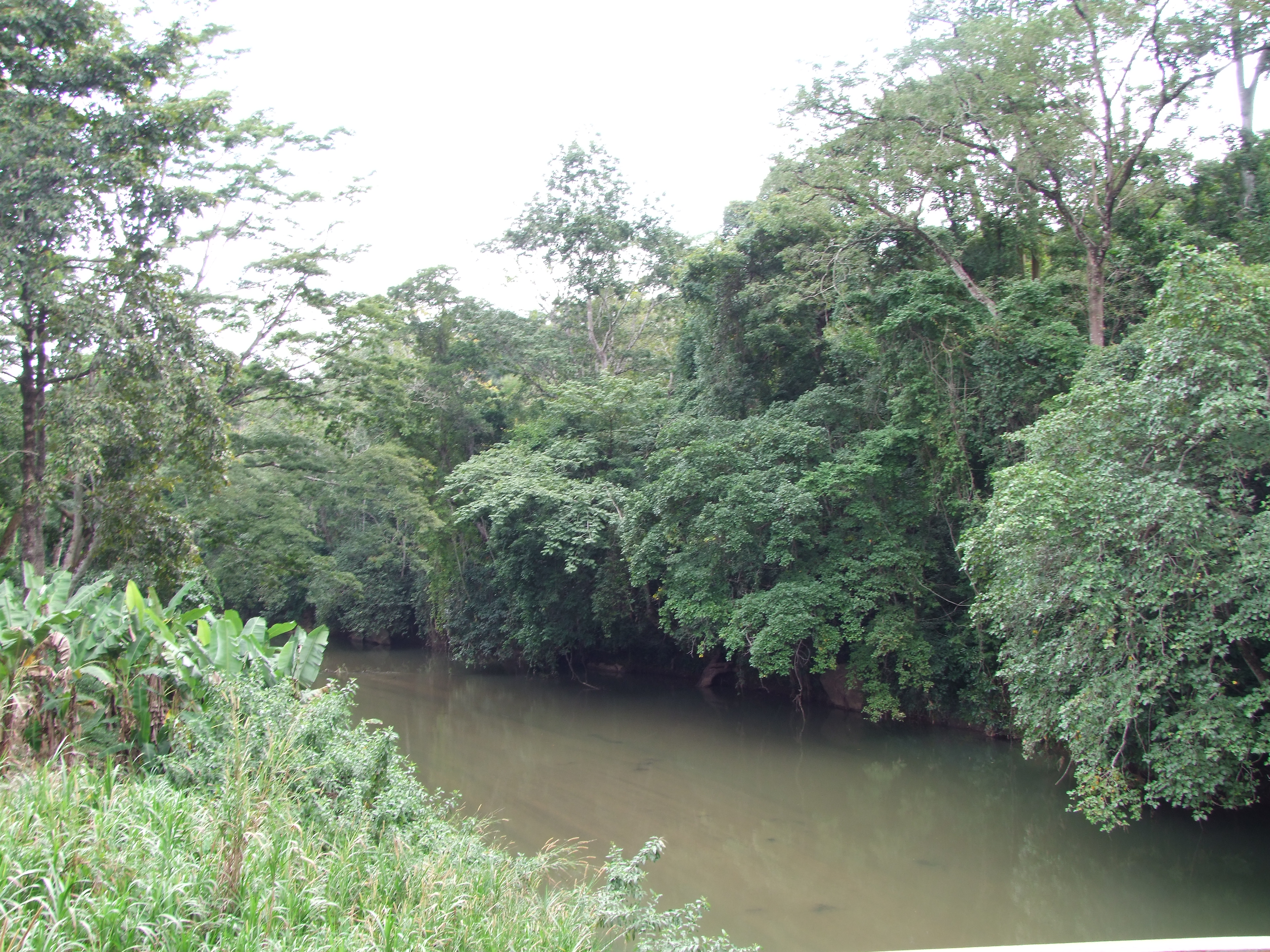
Ruvu River in Kimboza Forest Reserve

Kimboza Forest is a lowland forest in Tanzania located at the foothills of the Uluguru Mountains 7°2′S 37°47′E. The large Ruvu River crosses the reserve and the forest stretches to the top of the nearby hills. It is interspersed by massive rock outcrops and has several permanent small streams.

During the 20th century, Kimboza was depleted by deforestation and commercial logging. Over the past two decades, the forest has been repeatedly affected by large fires that have spread from the surrounding land as a result of slash-and-burn agriculture. Local inhabitants have played a role in conserving the forest despite issues with land rights. Local communities and the Tanzanian Forest Agency have been involved in a joint forest management program. Due to the severe shortage of resources, limited successes have been achieved.

The area is of special conservation interest due to its exceptional biodiversity, including many endemic plants and animals. Many medicinal wild plant species are used by local inhabitants around the Kimboza Forest Reserve.

Kimboza National Forest Reserve was established in 1964. It is currently recognized as an IUCN Category IV – habitat or species management area. The area is home to at least 226 vertebrate species, including 52 amphibians and 174 mammals. It has been described as the most important and species-rich lowland forest on limestone in Africa.

The forest holds special significance for conservation of the turquoise gecko (Lygodactylus williamsi), being only one of two localities in Tanzania where this critically endangered species is found.

Two timber trees, Cedrela odorata and Tectona grandis, were established as monotypic plantations in several logged areas. Cedrela odorata has now become invasive and is a threat to the unique biodiversity (management plan for Kimboza catchment forest reserve, Morogoro 2009).

The forest is readily accessible as it is crossed by the main road leading from Morogoro to the Selous Wildlife Reserve. It has a campsite with basic facilities. A number of trails leading visitors to a variety of ecological, cultural and landscape features have been established.

Degraded land, that is partly forested and adjacent to the Forest Reserve, is now protected as part of the recently initiated Kimboza-Ruvu Gorge Conservation Area. The Kirugo newsletter highlights the aims and achievements of this initiative.
