= Cynometra lukei =

Conservation status
- Endangered (IUCN 2.3)

Scientific classification
- Kingdom: Plantae
- Clade: Embryophytes
- Clade: Tracheophytes
- Clade: Spermatophytes
- Clade: Angiosperms
- Clade: Eudicots
- Clade: Rosids
- Order: Fabales
- Family: Fabaceae
- Genus: Cynometra
- Species: C. lukei

Binomial name
- Cynometra lukei Beentje

Species of plant

Cynometra lukei is a species of plant in the family Fabaceae. It is found in Kenya and Tanzania and threatened by habitat loss.
