= Nananu-i-Cake =

Island in Fiji

Native name: Ananugata

Geography
- Location: South Pacific Ocean
- Coordinates: 17°19′S 178°14′E
- Archipelago: Nananu
- Total islands: 3
- Major islands: Nananu-i-Ra, Nananu-i-Cake, Mabua
- Area: 2,225,780 m^{2} (23,958,100 sq ft)

Administration
- Fiji
- Division: Western Division
- Province: Ra
- District: Rakiraki

Nananu-i-Cake [nɑː.nɑːˈnuː iː ðɑːˈkeː] is an island in Fiji less than one kilometer off the coast of the main island of Viti Levu, near the Rakiraki-district in Ra Province.

Nananu-i-Cake is located immediately next to the island of Nananu-i-Ra. Nananu-i-Cake and Mabua (the islet located immediately to the southeast) islands are about 600 acres (242.81 hectares) in area.

The island's name, Nananu-i-Cake, means "Daydream Upwind" (or easterly) in Fijian. The island is also known by several other names, including Ananugata, Nananugata, Yananu and Nananu-i-Thake Island.

The main residence on the island was designed by the architecture firm of Murray Cockburn, based in Auckland. A deep-water jetty is on the island's western shore.

== History ==
In 1974, British businessman and politician Sir Harold Mitchell visited Fiji from the UK and purchased Nananu-i-Cake and Mabua as a retreat. Because of Harold's position of Vice-Chairman of the Conservative Party under Sir Winston Churchill and his social and political standing, several high-profile dignitaries visited and stayed on the island. Commemorative trees were planted for many of these high-profile visits. Nananu-i-Cake has remained in Sir Harold Mitchell's family since 1974.

Nananu-i-Cake also retains evidence of moka, stone formations built in tidal areas to trap fish at low tide, and ring-wall fortifications built with volcanic rocks.

As of 2012, the entire island was tentatively available for sale as a private island, for an estimated equivalent of around $8–8.5 million USD.

The island received renewed attention in 2022 as a group of cryptocurrency supporters attempted to raise funds to buy the island as a haven for cryptocurrency supporters, known as Cryptoland. The plan, which fell through, was widely mocked on social media and compared to the Fyre Festival.
