= Nananu-i-Ra =

Island in Fiji

Coordinates: 17°18′S 178°13′E

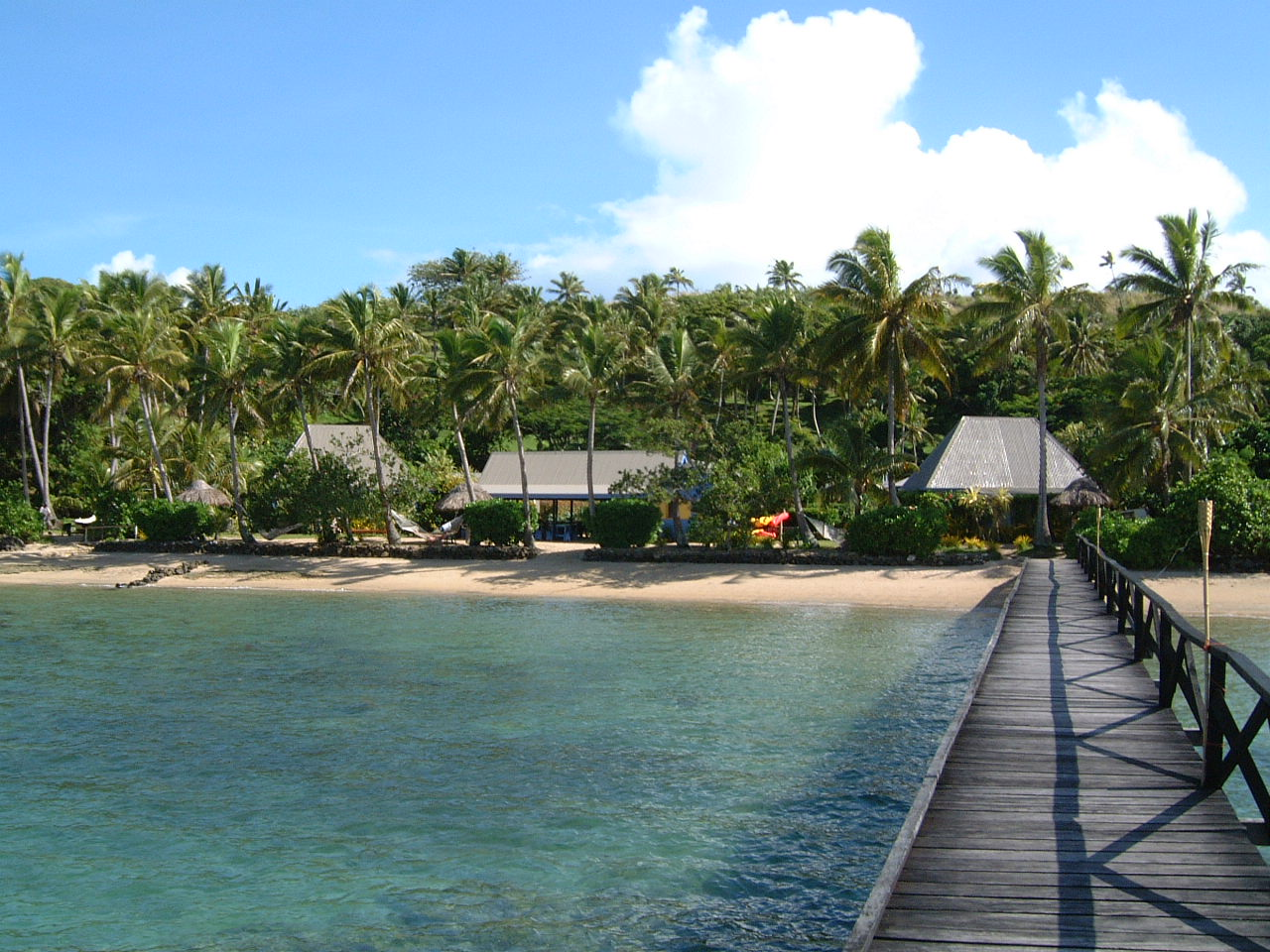
- Nananu-i-Ra

- Location within Fiji

Geography
- Location: South Pacific Ocean
- Archipelago: Nananu
- Area: 3.5 m^{2} (38 sq ft)
- Highest elevation: 180 m (590 ft)

Administration
- Fiji
- Division: Western Division
- Province: Ra
- District: Rakiraki

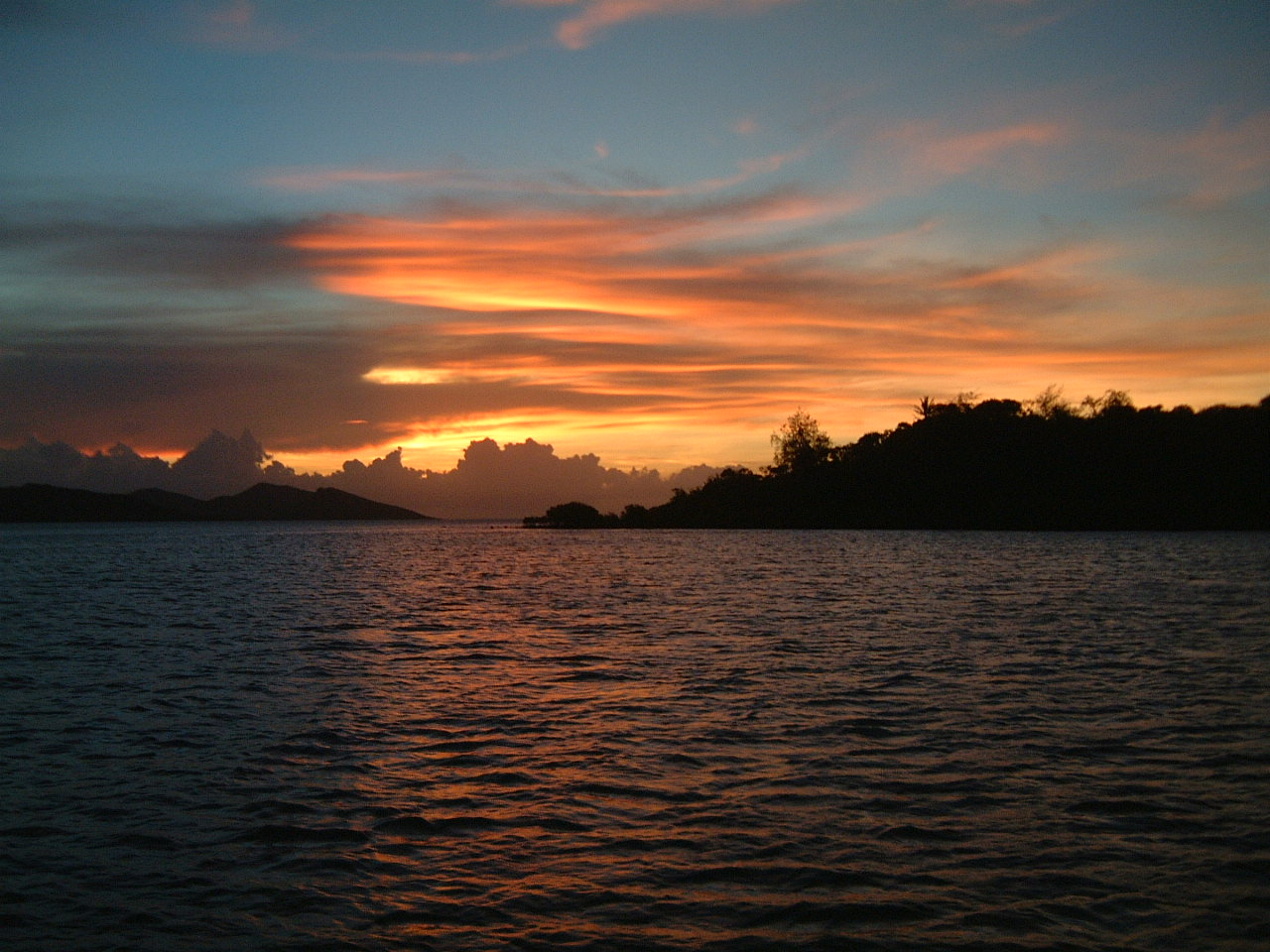
Sunset at Nananu-i-Ra

Nananu-i-Ra is an island in Fiji about 3 kilometers off the north coast of the main island of Viti Levu, near the town of Rakiraki in Ra Province. The island is 3.5 square kilometers and has a maximum elevation of 180 meters. The name "Nananu-I-Ra" means "Daydream of the West" in Fijian. Fijian mythology holds that Nananu-I-Ra is the point of departure for disembodied spirits leaving this world for the afterlife.

The highest peak and lookout point on the eastern side bears the remnants of an ancient settlement complete with fractured and decorated pottery in low-lying areas and the legend of mythical creatures.

Tribal-era fish traps were the main source of food and still exist in some places on Nananu-i-Ra.

The island holds an immense geopolitical importance as it is located between the ports and landing points between Viti Levu and Vanua Levu.

Nananu-i-Ra is privately owned. Safari Lodge owns a resort specific ally for wind sports - Windsurfing / Kitesurfing and Foiling.

The nearest township is Rakiraki. A full report is available from Town and Country Planning Fiji that describes the ecology and natural aspects of Nananu-i-Ra.

Wind turbines are the preferred energy source to power most residents' homes.

Neighbouring islands include Dolphin Island and Nananu-i-Cake Island.
