= Udre =

Udre or Ūdre is a both a given name and a surname. Notable people with the name include:

- Udre Udre (died 1840), Fijian chief
- Ingrīda Ūdre (1958–2024), Latvian politician
