= Meli Bolobolo =

- Tu Navitilevu (Chief of Rakiraki, Paramount Chief of Ra)
- Tenure: 30 September 2005 to 16 February 2015 (his death)
- Predecessor: Ratu Tevita Bolobolo
- Successor: incumbent

Ratu Meli Bolobolo (died 16 February 2015) was a Fijian chief and academic, who lectured at the Fiji Institute of Technology.

== Career ==
Bolobolo was installed on 30 September 2005 as the third in his family from the Uluda Household within the Mataqali Tunavitilevu and Tokatoka VaividiTu Navitilevu, or Paramount Chief of Rakiraki, in Ra Province. He succeeded his father, Ratu Tevita Bolobolo, who died in 2003. Ratu Meli Bolobolo died on 16 February 2015 and was buried beside his father, the Fiji Times reported. The title Tu Navitilevu is currently vacant, with the successor to be installed once the Yavusa Namotutu decides.

=== Legal case ===
All the Bolobolo's installation as Tu Navitilevu was not without controversy. The last being Ratu Meli; Ratu Esira Nawaqalevu, a spokesman for rival claimant Osea Cawaru Naitura, said that two of the three households making up the Tokatoka, or family that basically form the Mataqali (Clan) Tunavitilevu, had not endorsed Ratu Meli Bolobolo, and threatened to challenge his appointment by appealing to the Native Land Commission (NLC) and, failing that, to the courts. Bolobolo maintained, however, that he had been endorsed by the 42 yavusa under the jurisdiction of the Tu Navitilevu. The chief was for the people, he said, and saw no grounds for the NLC or the courts to overturn a decision made by the people. In fact his faction traditionally installed him without waiting for a decision from NLC to investigate the case, a gamble that worked in their favour as the subsequent NLC inquiry and decision was in favour of Ratu Meli.

On 15 December 2005, the NLC ruled in Bolobolo's favour, and on 19 December, Nawaqalevu announced Naitura's intention to appeal the decision in Fiji's High Court. The NLC had based its decision on inaccurate information, the spokesman said. Naitura's line of descent was senior to Bolobolo's, and hinted that political interference had played a role in the NLC's decision to recognize Bolobolo, with Cabinet Minister Jioji Banuve (also of Rakiraki) supporting a pro-Bolobolo faction led by Rasekaiya Tanoa. All key figures of Bolobolo faction have now passed on, Ratu Meli, Rasekaya Tanoa and Jioji Banuve.

Nawaqalevu claimed that Bolobolo's grandfather and father had held the Tui Navitilevu title improperly. "How the title came to be in the hands of the younger branch of the family is a question that the NLC admits it cannot answer," he told the Fiji Sun on 19 December, by which he cast doubts on how Bolobolo came to hold the title in favor of descendants of Isikeli Sabua, who was registered as the head of the Tokatoka Vaividi during the Registration of Native Land Owners at the time that Ratu Luke Vutiqica of the Tokatoka Dakuivakadreketi held the Title of Tu Navitilevu.

=== Documentation of ancestry ===
Bolobolo was a direct descendant of Naduva, the older son of Natadra also known as Ratu the founder of Namotutu, the yavutu of the Yavusa Namotutu, descendants now settle at Narewa and Rakiraki villages respectively. Banuve's descendants claim that Banuve gave the title to Naduva to validate their right to the title of Tu Navitilevu; according to the "Tukutuku Raraba of the Tikina of Rakiraki", Baleikanacea was the only one to mention the link to Banuve. This version of history was never substantiated by the rest of those who gave recorded evidence at the time. Ratu Luke Natavuto (Lei Matarua), one of the direct descendants of Banuve from the Matarua clan of Navolau, was influential in the decision to install Ratu Meli's father Raiko and subsequently Ratu Tevita Bolobolo (Ratu Meli's father) to be installed as Tu Navitilevu, however, the Fijian Landownership archives record that Ratu Luke Vutiqica was the first officially recognised Tu Navitilevu. The passing away of Ratu Luke Vutiqica ended the Tokatoka Dakuivakadreketi's hold on the title and it shifted to tokatoka Vaividi.

Ratu Luke Vutiqica was a direct descendant of Naudreudre, the last cannibal chief of Rakiraki. According to records held at the Fiji Archives, Ratu Luke Vutiqica of the i Tokatoka Dakuivakadreketi was Chief and head of the Mataqali Tuinavitilevu with Ratu Isikeli Sabua as head of the Tokatoka Vaividi. Tokatoka Vaividi was the only tokatoka out of the original three that survived and its descendants are the rightful holder of the Title Tu Navitilevu. Ratu Meli Bolobolo was a member of the Vaividi clan which gave him a rightful claim to the title equal to that of any other male in the Tokatoka. Records in the NLC and Archives, including studies by American anthropologist Martha Kaplan - author of "Neither Cargo Nor Cult", do not have a Bolobolo listed as Tunavitilevu. The Bolobolo name came into prominence when Ratu Tevita Bolobolo ascended the seat of Turaga Tunavitilevu in the 80s. Currently the Chiefly seat of Tunavitilevu is vacant. Ratu Meli's younger brother Ratu Emori Bolobolo a former Fijian National Rugby Rep and pioneering International Rugby player in France is expected to ascend the seat of Tunavitilevu according to a ruling of the NLC Tribunal in 2005 which by default ensured that the Bolobolo family retained the Chiefly title until they decided to hand it over to the other two households who make up the tokatoka- Nayabai (also known as Nagaunavou-Naitura) and Vailose (the Katalau). There is yet to be a formal traditional announcement yet on the decision from the Mataqali Tuinavitilevu to the Mataqali Tuinamo whose traditional role is to announce the nominated candidate after the Mataqali Tunavitilevu have met to decide on the next holder of the Tu Navitilevu. Until the decision is made the Chiefly seat remains vacant.
