= Vunikavikaloa =

- Village
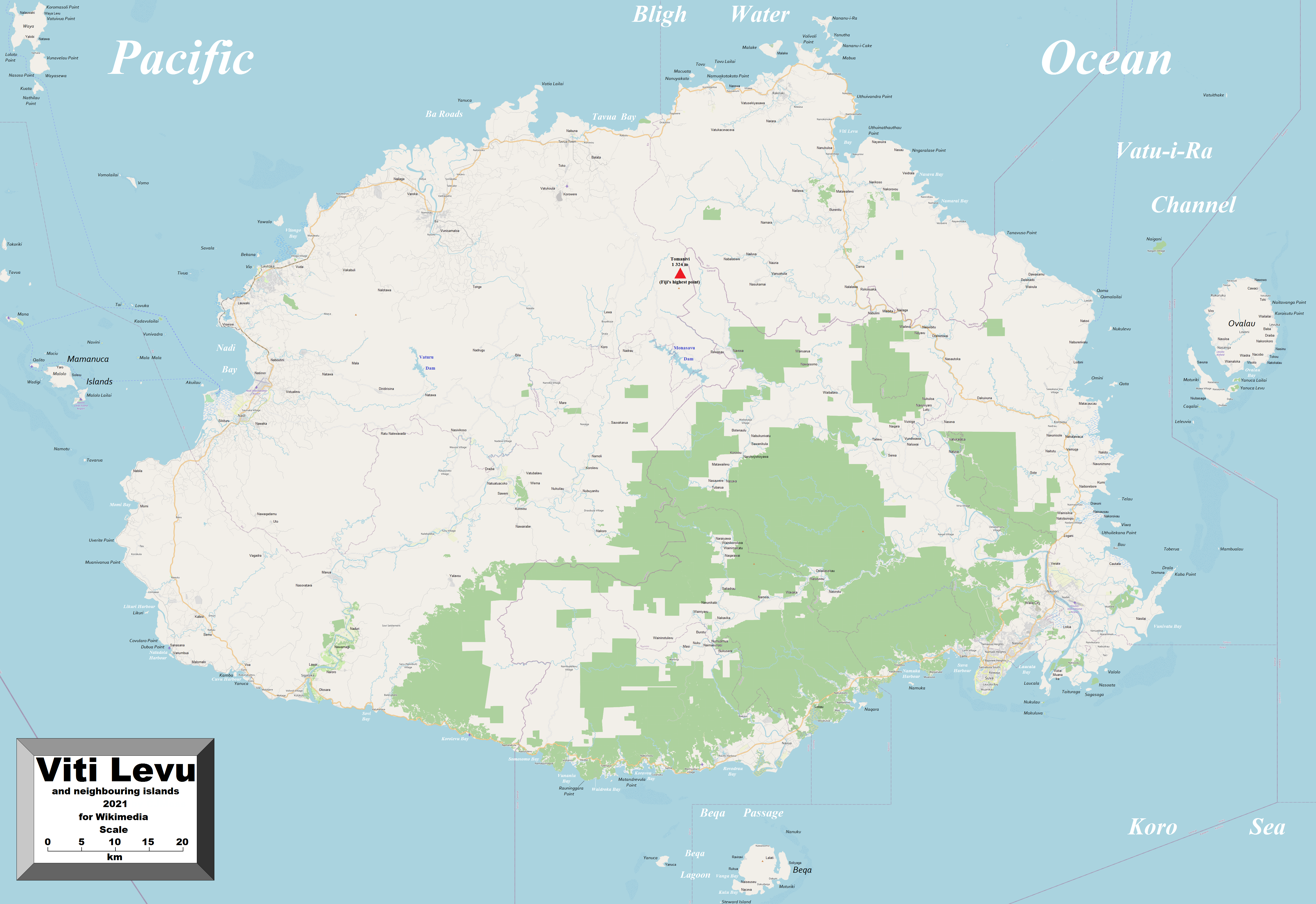
- Viti Levu

- Location in Fiji
- Country: Fiji
- Island: Viti Levu
- Division: Western Division
- Province: Ra
- Tikina: Nalawa
- Time zone: UTC+12

Vunikavikaloa (Fijian pronunciation: [βunikaβikaloa]; also known as Waimicia, Fijian pronunciation: [ɰai̯miði̯a]) is a settlement on the northern coasts of the Ra Province in Viti Levu, Fiji. It consists of a few schools and a hospitals, and sporting grounds. It is situated in the district of Nalawa. The area also consists of the ancient tombs of Fijian cannibal chiefs, and pottery has been found at this time going back to 1000 BC.

It is home to 4 major schools: Ra High, Vunikavikloa Arya School, Nalawa Central School and Dobuilevu Muslim School. Vunikavikloa Arya School, which was destroyed by Cyclone Winston in 2016, reopened just over a year later.

The Nalawa Football Club, which is affiliated to the Fiji Football Association and plays in the second division of the Association, is based here.

Major exports are carpets, mangoes and potatoes.
