= Naocobau =

Naocobau Naothombau
- Village
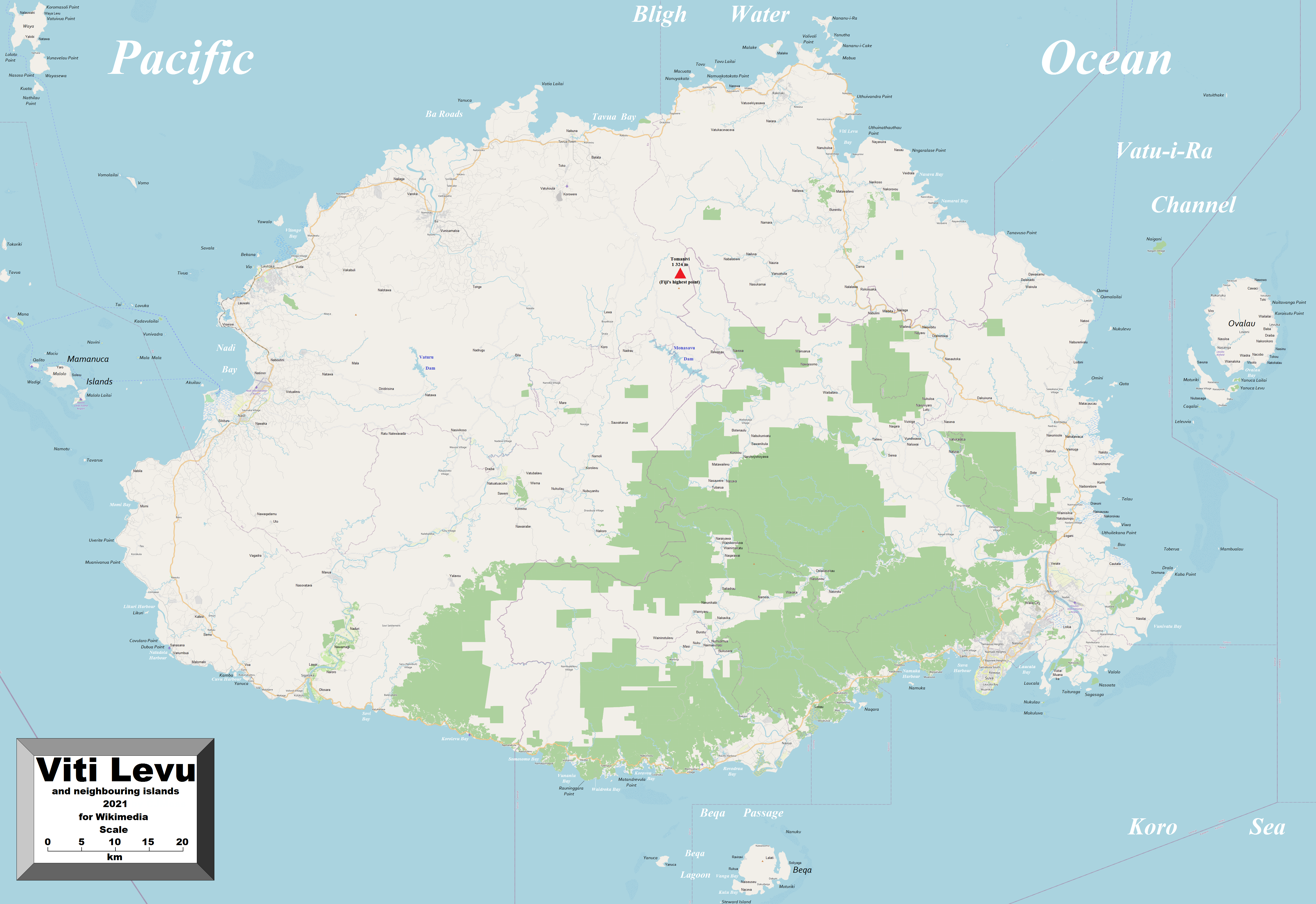
- Viti Levu with Naocobau in the northeast

- Location in Fiji
- Coordinates: 17°30′49″S 178°21′23″E
- Country: Fiji
- Island: Viti Levu
- Division: Western Division
- Province: Ra
- District: Nakorotubu District
- Elevation: 68 m (223 ft)
- Time zone: UTC+12

Nacobau is a village located in the Nakorotubu District, Ra Province, Fiji .

== Geography ==
Naocobau is a village located in the Nakorotubu District, Ra Province, Fiji Islands, on the northeastern coast of the main island of Viti Levu. Its terrain is mostly rugged, covered with black rocky mountains, while its seashore is a mixture of black and white sandy beaches.

== History ==
Naocobau was established in the early 1800s. The early settlers of Naocobau came from Nacokovaki which is located approximately 3 kilometers southeast of the current location. Nacokovaki was an organized or civilized independent state and was the home of the first District Commissioner (Mr Wilson) of Fiji during the late 1700s. Nacokovaki was where the first government station was first established in the province of Ra before being relocated to Nabukadra in the 1860s and later to Nanukuloa, as the Ra Provincial Council Head Office, in the province of Saivou. Nacokovaki is well known to the people of Ra. Nacokovaki is where part of the tribes of Nakorotubu resettled before relocating to the coastlines as to their current location.

== Timeline ==
Naocobau: Consists of families from 4 major distinguished tribes/ groups currently living in Nacobau village:4Vemala 3 2Dewala 1Dalitaulevu

== Gallery ==
Tukutuku ni vuvale makawa mai na vuvale Dalitaulevu.
