= Vaileka =

Urban center in Rakiraki, Ra Province, Fiji

Vaileka वैलेका (Hindi) Rakiraki
- Village and Tikina
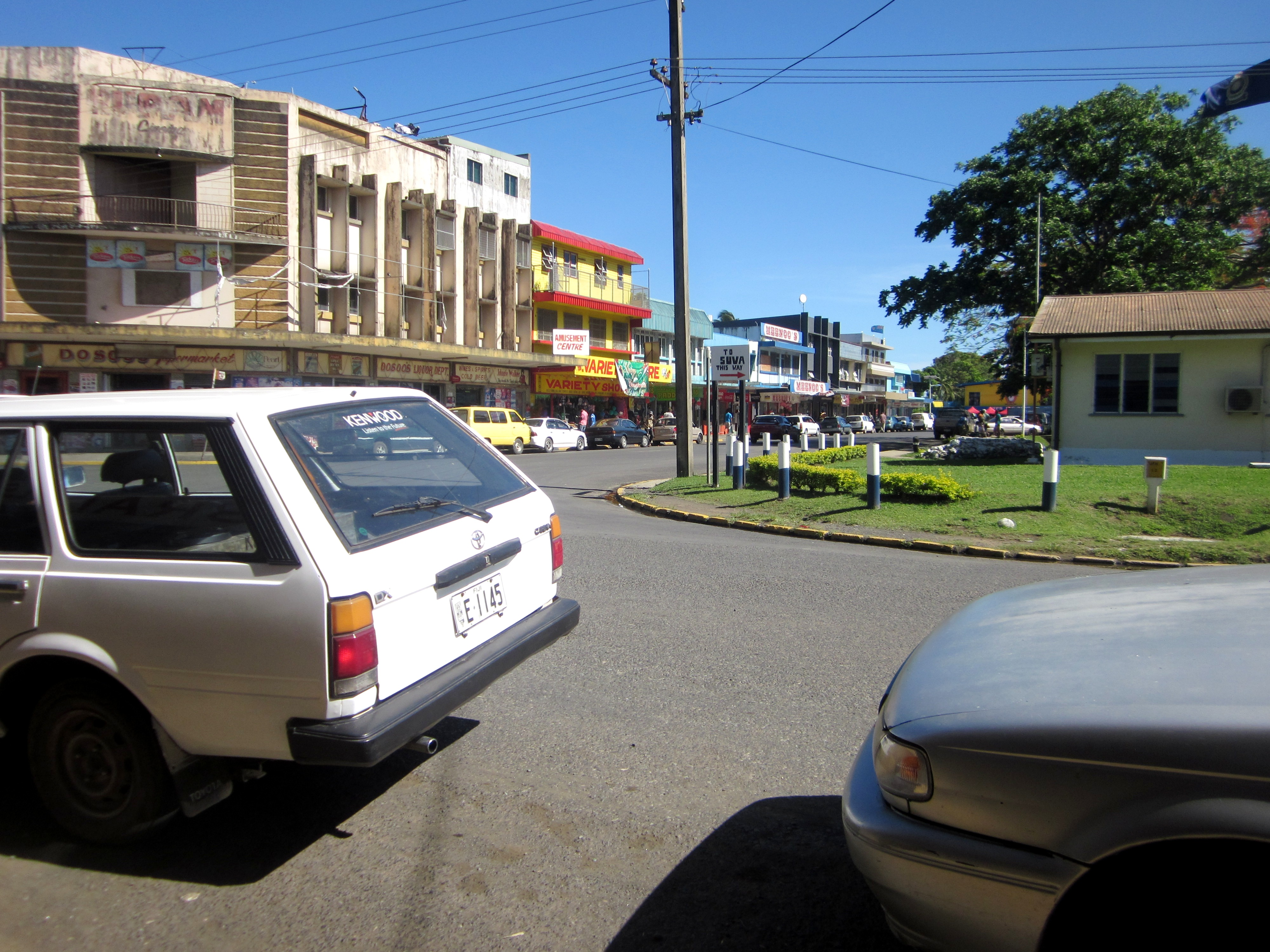
- Vaileka street scene

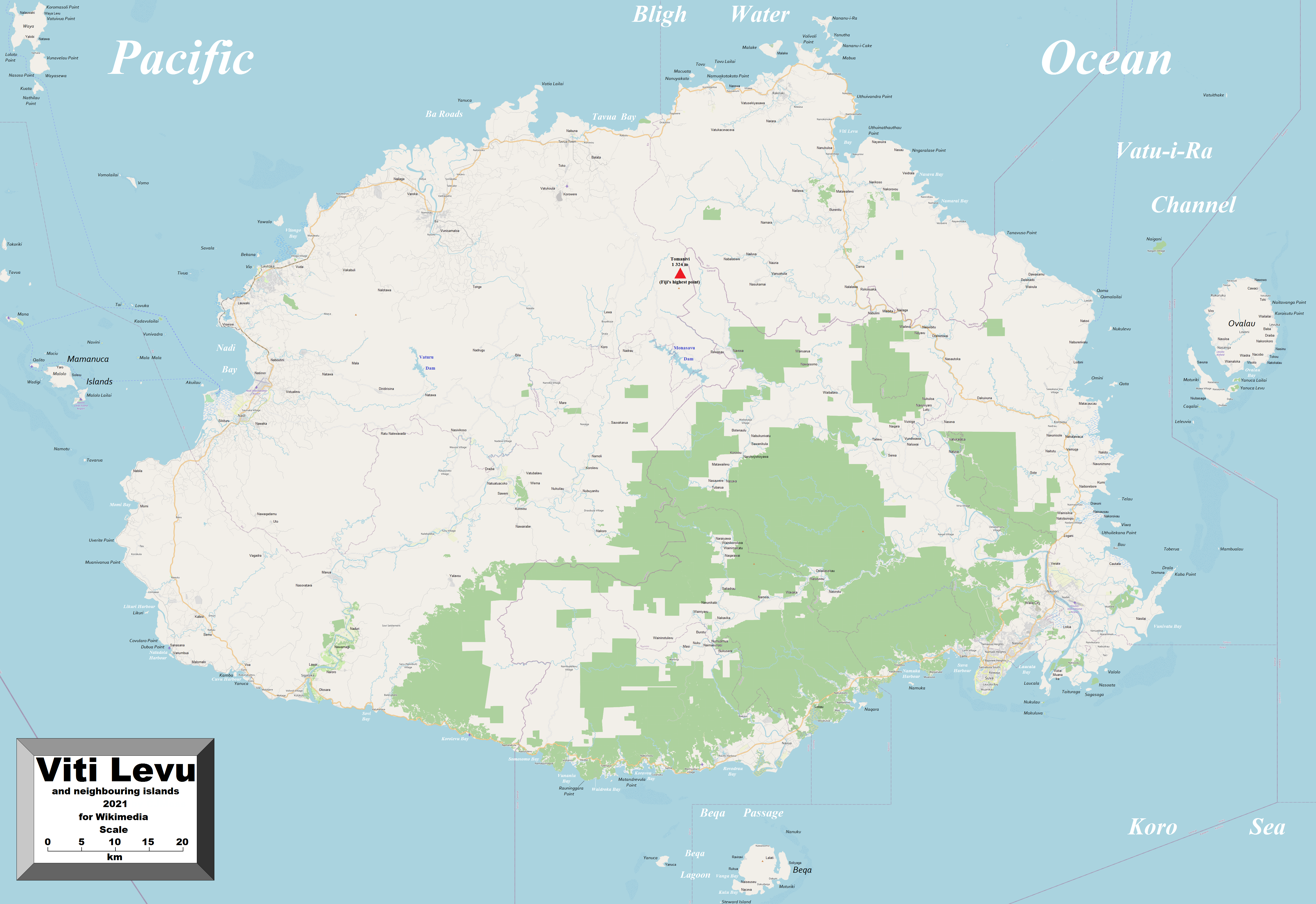
- Viti Levu with Rakiraki in the northeast

- Location in Fiji
- Country: Fiji
- Island: Viti Levu
- Division: Western Division
- Province: Ra

Area
  - Total: 39 sq mi (100 km^{2})

Population (2007)
  - Total: 4,952
  - Density: 130/sq mi (50/km^{2})
  - Tikina: 13,908
- Time zone: UTC+12

Vaileka, commonly known as Rakiraki Town, is an urban centre in Fiji, in the Rakiraki region of Ra Province. It had a population of 3,361 at the 1996 census, the last to date. It is not officially a "town," however: that term is legally reserved for urban centres with organized municipal governments. The status of the area may be changed. The Fiji Times reported on 4 October 2006 that Uraia Waqa, Chairman of the Rakiraki Local Government Authority, had called for Vaileka to be officially incorporated as a Town, to be known as Rakiraki Town, in order to attract government investment. Local Government and Urban Development Minister Chaitanya Lakshman was reported to be sympathetic to the proposal.

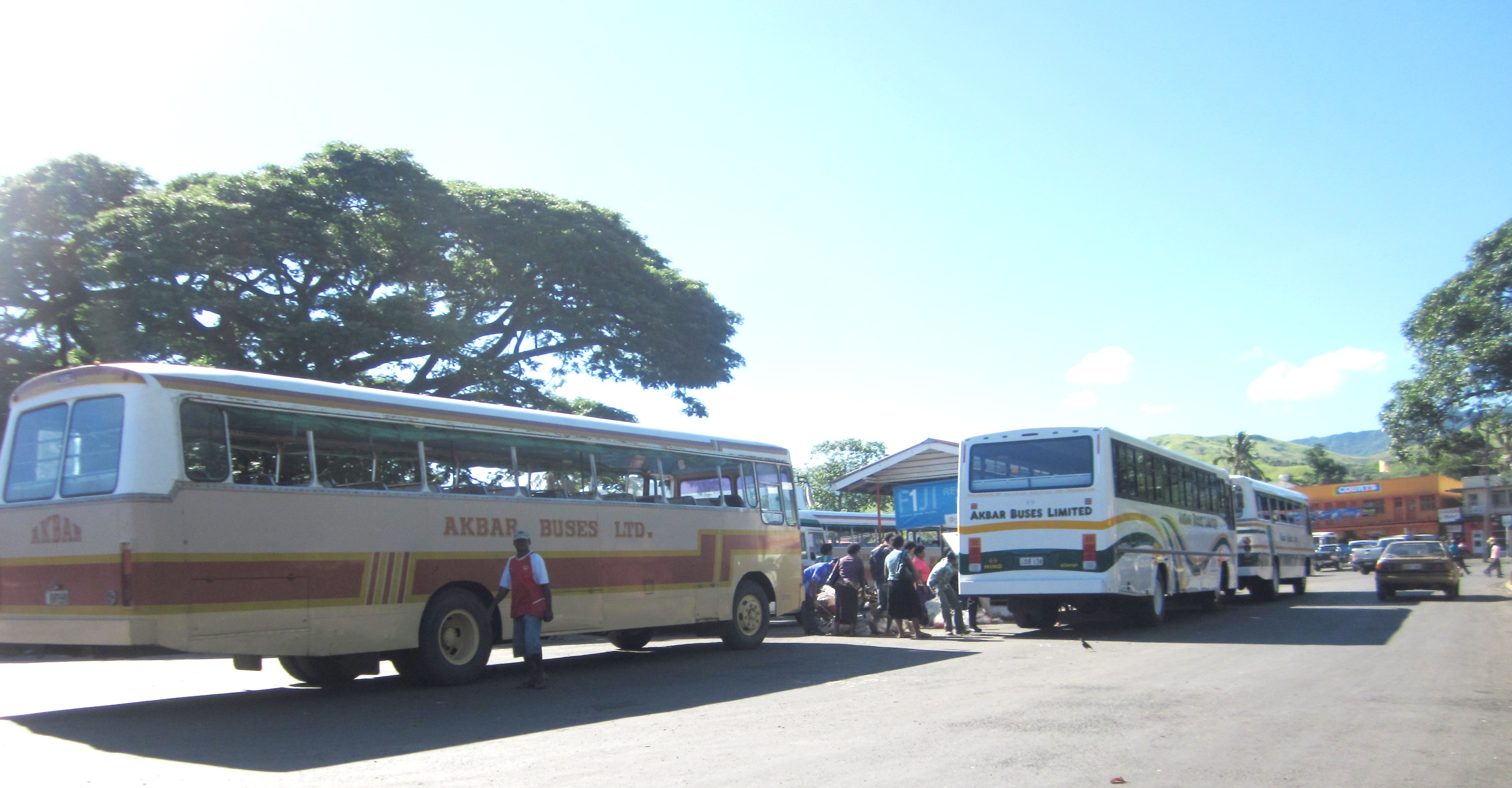
Buses parked at the Vaileka bus station

The Penang Sugar Mill is being operated by the Fiji Sugar Corporation on the banks of the Penang River, about one kilometer outside of the township.

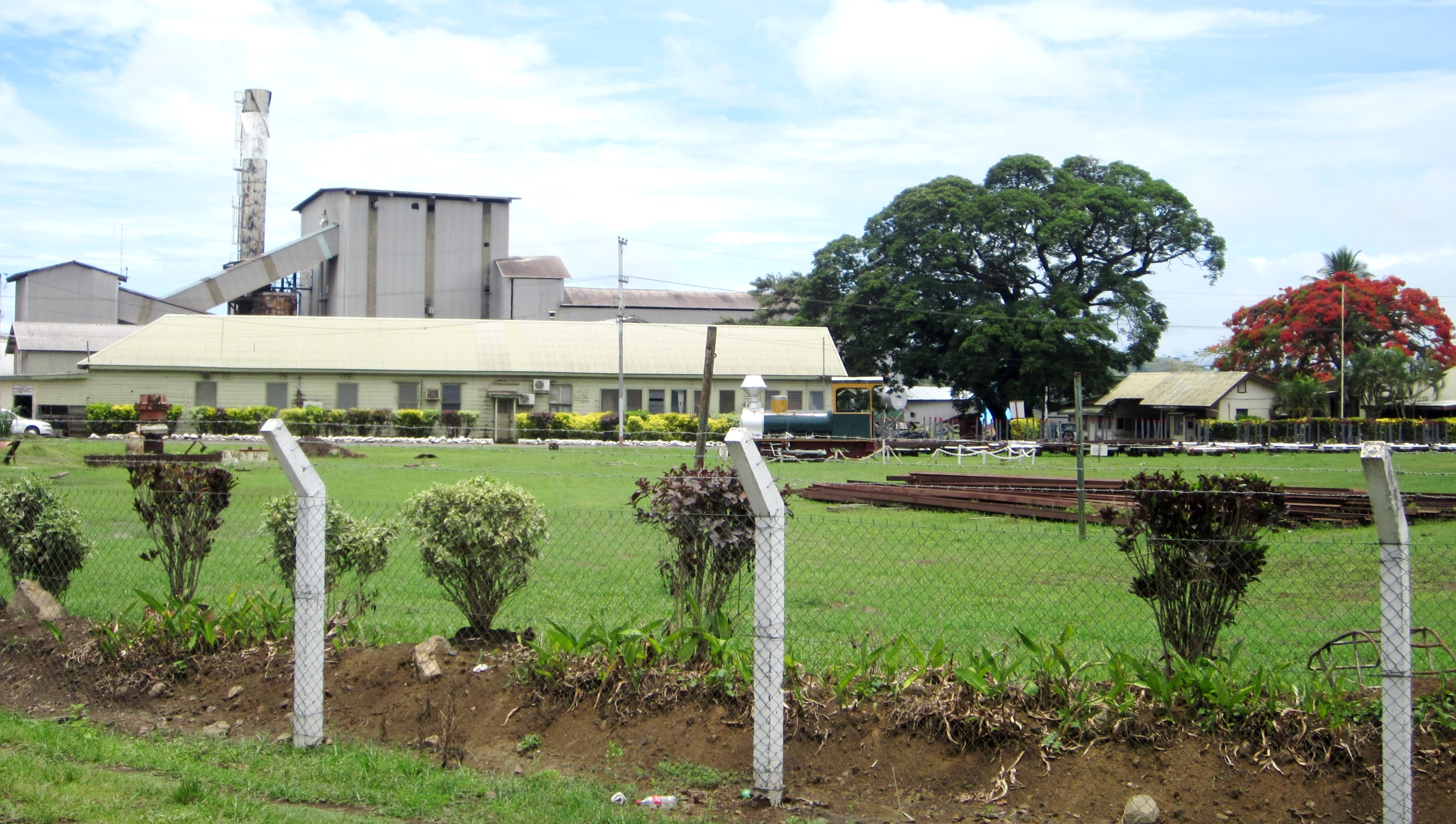
The Fiji Sugar Corporation, Penang Mill, Rakiraki.

Vaileka is twinned with Irish town Kenmare since 2015.
