= Turaga na Ratu ni Natauiya =

The Turaga na Ratu ni Natauiya is one of the tribal chiefs who lead a sub-district in the district of Saivou in Ra Province, on the western side of Fiji. Five villages abide by the leadership of the Turaga na Ratu ni Natauiya:

- Nanukuloa
- Naiserelagi
- Burotu
- Tokio
- Rokoroko

The chief's royal house and residence, or Bure Turaga, is in the vanua vaka turaga (village called) Nanukuloa, where the Turaga na Ratu ni Natauiya normally resides. The right-hand man of the chief also resides in the village.
