= Nalawa F.C. =

Fijian football club

- Full name: Nalawa Football Club
- Founded: 1978
Home colours

Nalawa F.C. was a Fijian football team playing in the second division of the Fiji Football Association competitions. It is based in Vunikavikaloa in Ra, which is a situated on the island of Viti Levu.

Their uniform includes black shirt with white trim.

== History ==
The Nalawa Soccer Association was formed in 1978, under the presidency of Ram Vinod.

== See also ==
- Fiji Football Association

== Bibliography ==
- M. Prasad, Sixty Years of Soccer in Fiji 1938 – 1998: The Official History of the Fiji Football Association, Fiji Football Association, Suva, 1998.
