= Udre Udre =

Fijian chief and cannibal

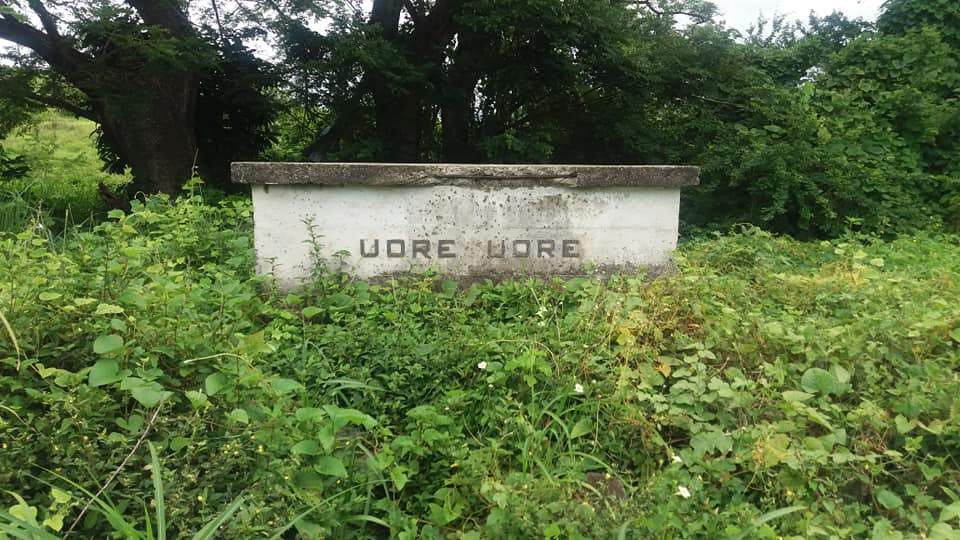
- Udre Udre's burial ground in Rakiraki District, Ra Province
- Born: 1798; Rakiraki, Fiji
- Died: 1840 (aged 42); Northern Fiji
- Cause of death: Gunshot wounds
- Occupation: Ratu
- Years active: 1798–1840
- Known for: Being the "most prolific cannibal" during the 19th century

Ratu Udre Udre (pronounced [uɳɖe 'uɳɖe], /ʊndreɪ ˈʊndreɪ/; born 1798, died 1840) was a Fijian cannibal, chief and warrior. He is listed by Guinness World Records as "most prolific cannibal" — during the early 19th century, he reportedly ate 872 people", although differing accounts give different totals of how many people he had eaten. The total of 872 was based on "a row of smallish stones extending about 200 yards" near where Udre Udre lived, with each stone placed by Udre Udre to account for a person he had eaten.

Udre Udre is believed to have been shot and killed by Fiji government officials in 1840. His tomb is located in Rakiraki District.

== See also ==
- Cannibalism in Oceania
- List of incidents of cannibalism
