= Nakorotubu District =

One of nineteen districts in Fiji's Ra Province

Nakorotubu is one of nineteen districts in Fiji's Ra Province. It consists of seven sub-districts or sub-regions: the five villages of Namarai, Naocobau, Nadavacia, Saioko and Verevere. According to the 2017 census, the district had a population of 4,392.

Nakorotubu also refers to one of the four main traditional regions (with Saivou, Nalawa, Rakiraki) of Ra with the referral traditional title of Gonesau and covers the geographical area of seven of the nineteen districts or sub regions (tikina makawa) of Ra: Nakorotubu, Bureiwai, Kavula, Bureivanua, Nakoilava, Mataso and Navitilevu.

== History ==
Nakorotubu recorded significant tribal war victories around the country that include the Puakaloa or Vuakaloa campaign, the conquer of the chiefly Kedekede fort of the Vuanirewa clan in Lakeba, Lau and the conquer of the whole of Vanua Levu (Cakaudrove, Bua and Macuata) in the' Torotorosila campaign'.

In the centre of Nabukadra village in Kavula, Nakorotubu is the grave of Ratu Mara Kapaiwai, a high chief of Bau Island, the grandfather of Ratu Sir Lala Sukuna who was killed as a result of intra-family rivalries involving his cousin, the then ruler of the kingdom of Bau, Ratu Seru Cakobau in the early 19th century. Before his death, he came to Nabukadra to request his cousin, Ratu Josua Mara Kapaiwai(1) to ensure that his heart is not eaten when he was hanged by Ratu Cakobau. Their great grandmothers Ofia and Moqei were half sisters, i.e. from same mother and were war tokens from the Puakaloa campaign to Bau and Nakorotubu respectively. The Nakorotubu warriors snatched Kapaiwai's body from Bau and had a proper burial at the center of Nabukadra village before Kapaiwai's heart could be eaten by Cakobau. The grave remains a prominent landmark at the center of Nabukadra village.
