= Rakiraki District =

Coordinates: 17°22′S 178°9′E

Rakiraki (Fijian pronunciation: [rakiraki]) is a district in Fiji's Ra Province. It is located between Tavua and Korovou when travelling along Kings Road, on the northern coast of Viti Levu, Fiji's largest island. From Nadi International Airport, Rakiraki is approximately 130km away and typically a two and a half hour drive away.

At the 1996 census, the Rakiraki district had a population of 29,137, with 15,325 in the smaller Rakiraki sub-district. Of these, 3361 lived in Vaileka, Rakiraki's principal urban centre. At the 2007 census, Vaileka (Rakiraki's principle urban centre) had recorded an increase to 4952 residents

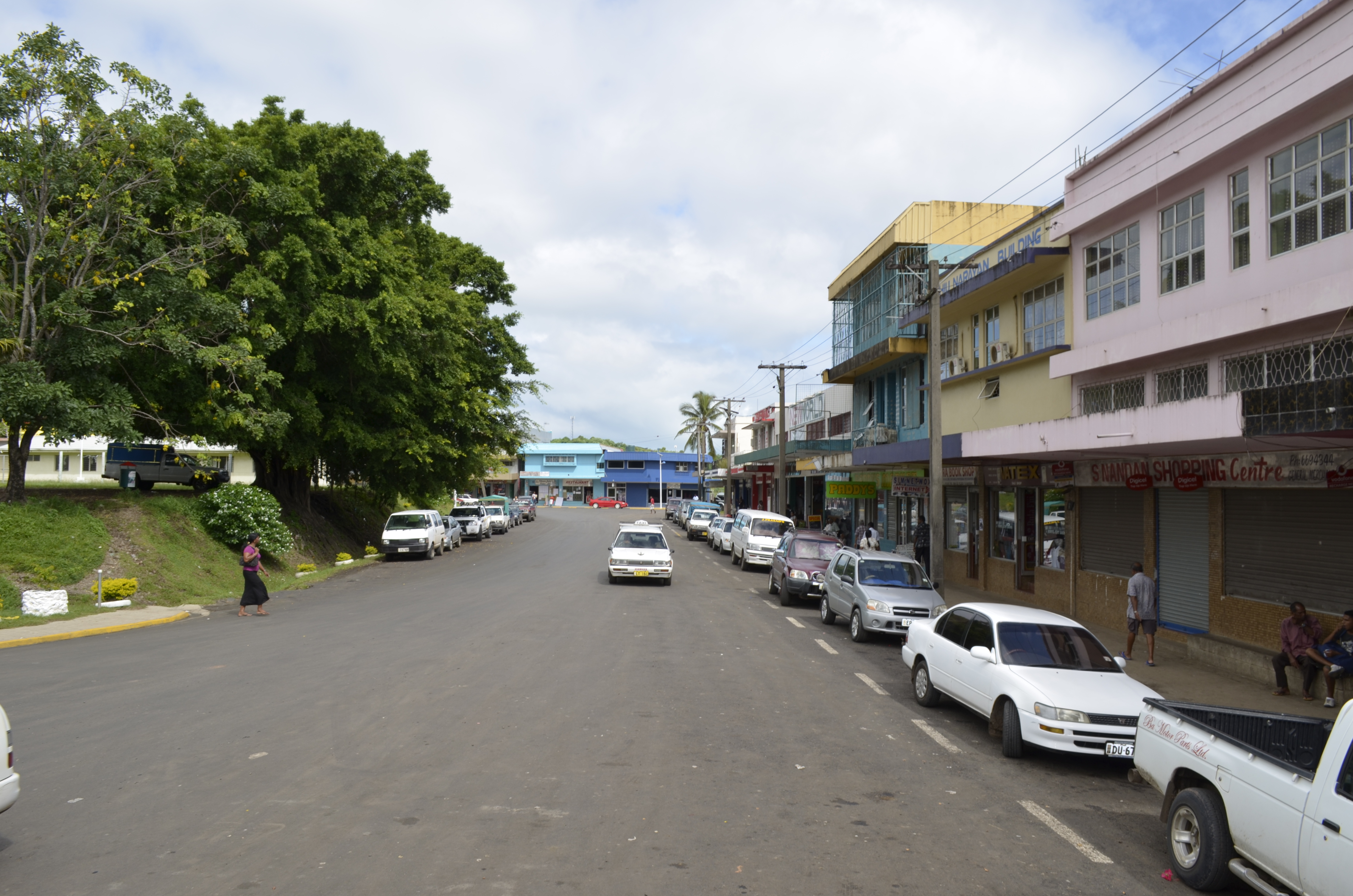
Street on Rakiraki Town, the only town of the district

and according to the 2017 census, the district had a population of 13,908.

The present Fijian Administration district or tikina of Rakiraki is part of the province or yasana of Ra. The other tikina are Saivou (to the south of the Nakauvadra), Nakorotubu (on the eastern coast) and Nalawa (in the mountainous interior to the south of Saivou and the west of Nakorotubu).

Rakiraki lies in the north-eastern corner of the island of Viti Levu, bordering Navitilevu Bay to the south-east, the Nakauvadra Range to the south, and the tikina of Tavua in the yasana of Ba, to the west. It includes the island of Malake and other islets in that part of the sea forming its northern boundary.

Traditional Fijian villages in the Rakiraki district are Namuaimada, Navolau Number 1, Navolau Number 2, Navutulevu, Navuavua, Malake & Nakorokula.

== History ==
Rakiraki District boasts a number of historic buildings and sites. It has the first sugar mill in Fiji, the first Hindu Temple and the first primary school established in the Western Division of Fiji.

The Town of Rakiraki was legally declared on Thursday July 1 2010. The Public Service Commission approved the use of an office space in the government rented complex at Vaileka House where official operations commenced on Monday 6th July 2010.

== Economic activities ==
Agriculture and tourism are the mainstays of the Rakiraki economy. The Fiji Sugar Corporation operates the Penang Sugar Mill on the Penang River, one kilometre north-east of Vaileka.

Sugar cane is grown in the valleys, while cattle are raised in the highlands. Root crops, including yaqona (kava) are also cultivated.

Fiji Water is bottled 20 kilometres west of the main town of Rakiraki.

The first on-grid solar system for Rakiraki Town was commissioned by the retail brand, Rups Big Bear, in February, 2025. The 20kW on-grid system is a first for the area, which can offset approximately 23 metric tons of CO_{2} annually, equivalent to planting 380 trees per year.

== Landmarks ==
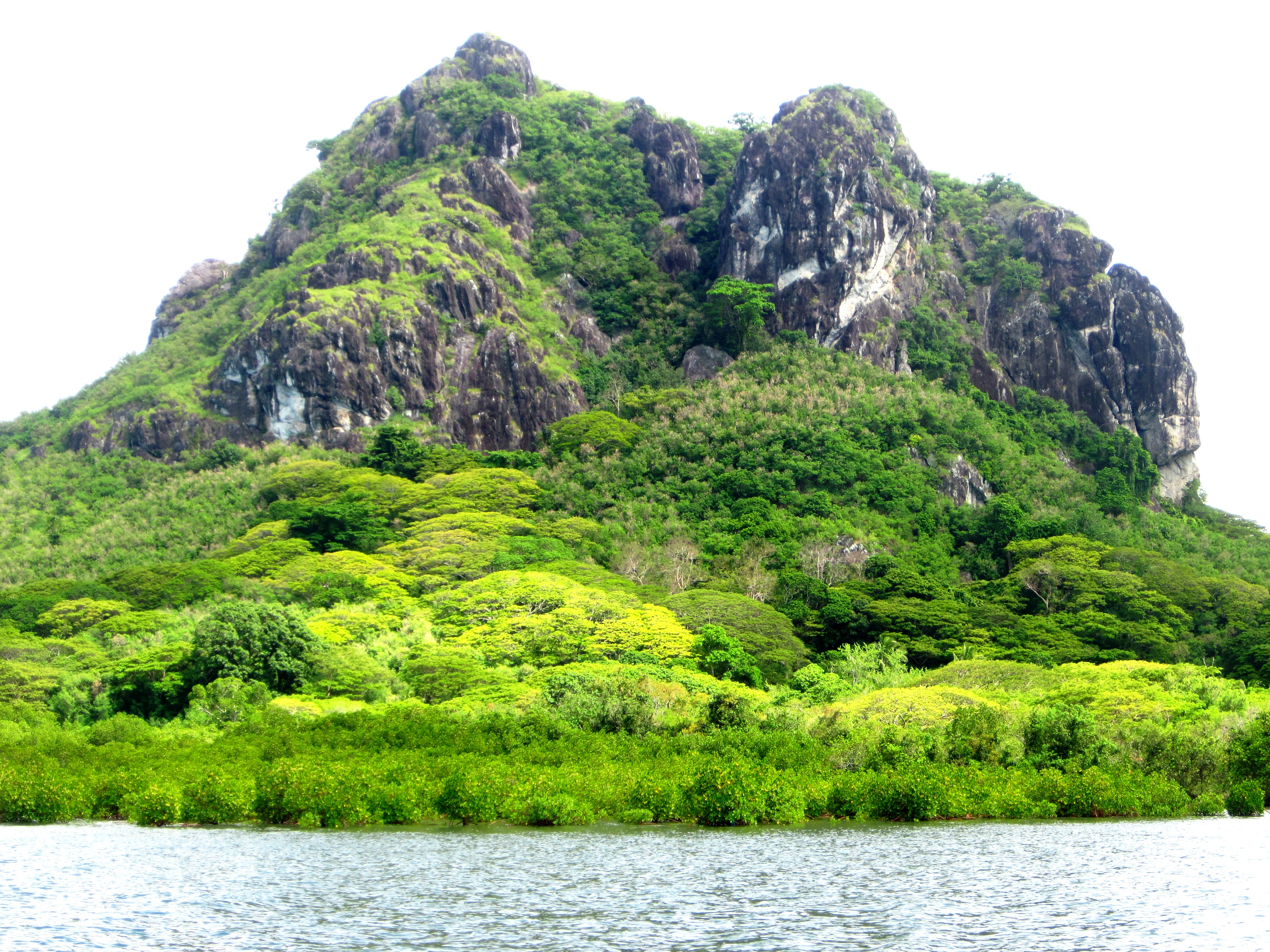
Navatu Rock

Prominent landmarks include Navatu Rock, in Vitawa village, believed to be one of Fiji's oldest human settlements. Pottery excavated at the base of the rock has been dated to around 1000BC.

About 1.5 kilometres offshore lies the island of Nananu-i-Ra. Fijian mythology holds that this island is the disembodied spirits' point of departure from this world to the afterlife. A village once crowned the peak of this island.

The tomb of Ratu Udre Udre, a famous 19th century cannibal chief who reportedly consumed more than 800 of his victims, is close to the township of Vaileka.

The renowned Nakauvadra Range which is associated with Fijian mythology is visible from anywhere in the Rakiraki district. It is also the main contributing factor to the dry conditions that prevail throughout much of the year in the Rakiraki region.

== Notable people ==
Many noted Fijian politicians have originated from this area, such as Sidiq Koya, who fought for Fijian workers' rights. Others include Tomasi Vuetilovoni, Meli Bolobolo, Joji Banuve, Subas Chand, Devi Prasad, lawyer Dhiren Prasad and George Shiu Raj.
