= Fiji Sugar Corporation =

Government-owned sugar milling company in Fiji

Fiji Sugar Corporation (FSC) is the government-owned sugar milling company in Fiji having monopoly on production of raw sugar in Fiji. It is also the largest public enterprise in the country employing roughly 1,800 people, while another 200,000 or more depend on it for their livelihood in rural sugar cane belts of Fiji.

It operates four sugar mills, the Lautoka mill, the Rarawai mill in Ba District, Fiji the Penang mill in Rakiraki in Viti Levu, and the Labasa mill in Vanua Levu. The mill in Lautoka is the largest in Fiji and once held the title of being the largest sugar mill in the Southern Hemisphere.

The FSC was incorporated by an Act of Parliament in 1972, and officially came to existence on April 1, 1973. As of May 31, 2009, of the 44,399,998 fully paid shares, the government owned 30,239,160 shares (68.1%), and statutory bodies, local public companies and individuals held the rest of the shares.

FSC has a board of directors appointed by the government, and the board acts as a policy-making and governing body. It is managed and staffed predominantly by Fiji citizens. Following independence from the Great Britain, the Colonial Sugar Refining Company continued to act as Fiji's sugar marketing agent overseas until 1976 when the government formed Fiji Sugar Marketing Company, Ltd. to handle marketing activities. FSC has its head office in Lautoka.

With farmers wanting more say in their dealings with FSC, the government decided on reforms within the industry. The Sugar Industry Act of 1984 restructured the industry and established three new organizations: the Sugar Commission of Fiji, the Sugar Industry Tribunal and the Sugar Cane Growers Council.

It also established the Mill Area Committees as an advisory body on local sugar matters. The Sugar Commission is the coordinating body, and the Tribunal adjudicates contractual relations between farmers and FSC, as well as any disputes among the parties. The Sugar Cane Growers Council acts on behalf of farmers, and trade unions represent interests of FSC employees.

One of the major functions of the Sugar Industry Tribunal is to establish and regulate master awards controlling contractual relationship between FSC and cane farmers. The master award came into effect on November 23, 1989. It replaced the sugar cane contract. Independent arbitrators who had set the contract terms were Sir Malcolm Eve (later, Lord Silso) and a judge, Lord Denning, both British.

Soon after it took over assets of the Colonial Sugar Refining Company, FSC embarked upon expansion of Fiji's milling capacity. The four mills are currently capable of manufacturing more than 500,000 tonnes of sugar per season. Some consideration has been given to increase mill capacity up to 600,000 tonnes a year. Such expansion would require substantial investment.

Under the Seaqaqa cane development scheme, over 5,000 hectares were brought under cane by 1980. This project cost $22 million and accommodated 800 ethnic Fijian and Indo-Fijian farmers. Funds were borrowed from the World Bank to help finance the project.

The government recognizes the problem of being excessively dependent on just one crop. The government has, among other measures, encouraged tourism in an effort to diversify the economy. Tourism is sensitive to a number of factors, and its contribution to the economy is still less than that of sugar.

The corporation has availed Line of Credit worth $55.78 million granted by India.
