= Penang (Rakiraki) Sugar Mill =

Former sugar mill in Fiji

Coordinates: 17°22′22.76″S 178°9′44.8″E

The Penang Sugar Mill in Rakiraki, Fiji was one of the four sugar mills operated by the Fiji Sugar Corporation. The FSC is the sole producer of raw sugar in Fiji.

== History ==
The Chalmers brothers built a mill at Penang in 1878. It was later transferred to Fraser and Company and then sold to Melbourne Trust Company in 1896. The mill was enlarged (with machinery from Mago Island, where a mill had closed in 1895) and the increased crushing capacity together with favourable weather conditions enabled the mill to operate independently. In 1922, as the price paid for the cane decreased, farmers began to abandon their farms and the mill had to shut down. Planting resumed in 1923 with the promise of higher cane prices in future. The mill reopened for crushing in 1925 but in 1926 was taken over by the Colonial Sugar Refining Company (CSR). In 1973, the Penang Mill, together with three other mills being operated by the CSR were sold to the Fiji Government-owned FSC. The Fiji Government is still the major shareholder in the company.

== Happy Valley Railway ==
Sugarcane was farmed in the Rakiraki district since the late 1870's, while a railway to transport cane was initiated in 1916, with the Penang Mill to Ellington Wharf line. Later, more lines were added and by 2016, when the Penang Mill closed, there were 43.1 km (26.8miles) of railway lines, between Nanuku and Korokula, including branches.

== Present condition ==
The Penang mill was the smallest of the four sugar mills operated by the FSC, the other three being Rarawai Sugar Mill in Ba District, Labasa Sugar Mill and Lautoka Sugar Mill. Sugar was supplied to the mill by train and trucks. The mill had the distinction of having the highest proportion of the four mils of cane delivered to it by trucks. Sugar was exported via the Ellington Wharf, also in the Rakiraki district. As the result of damage caused by TC Winston in 2016, Penang which was already the least economic mill, closed.
