= Ra Province =

Province of Fiji

Coordinates: 17°30′S 178°10′E

- Province
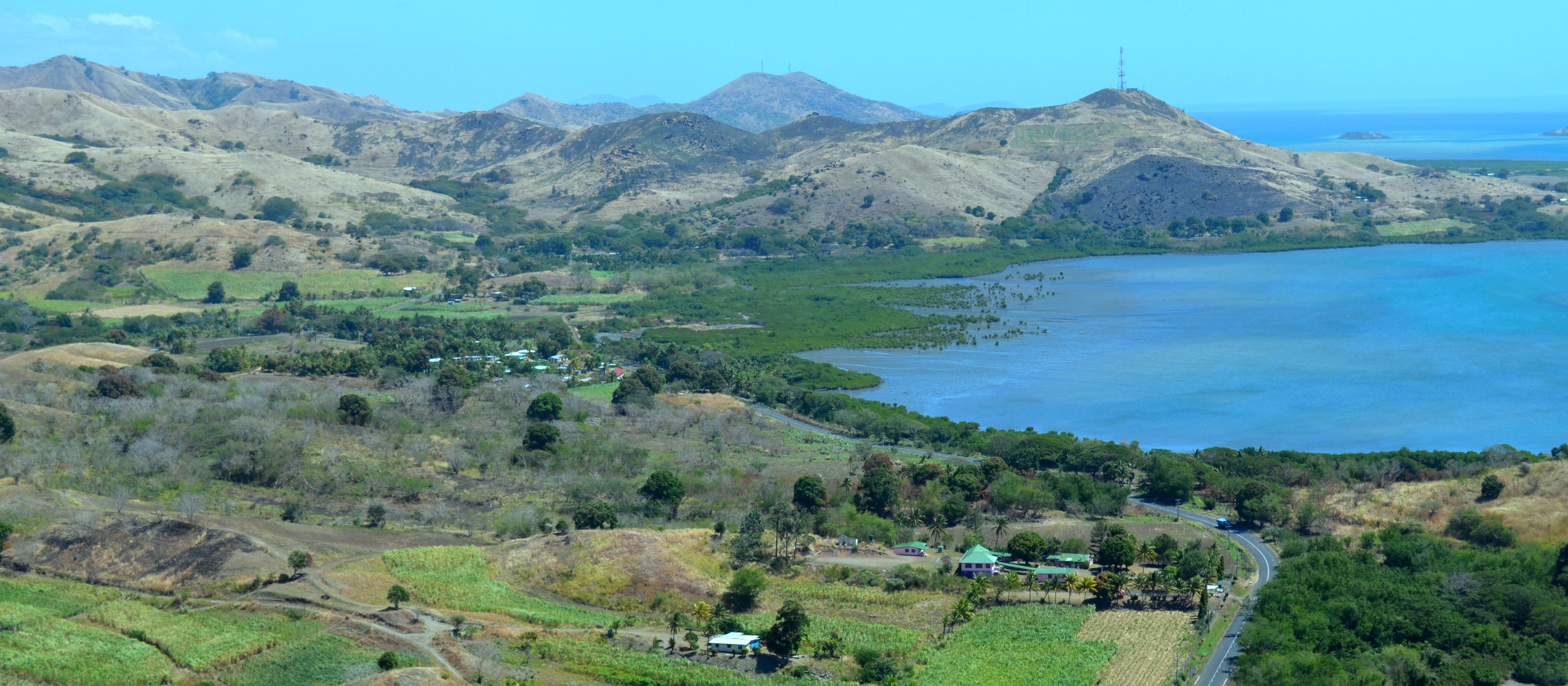
- Coastal communities of the Ra Province.
- Interactive map of Ra Province
- Country: Fiji
- Division: Western Division

Area
  - Total: 1,341 km^{2} (518 sq mi)

Population (2017)
  - Total: 30,416
  - Density: 22.68/km^{2} (58.75/sq mi)

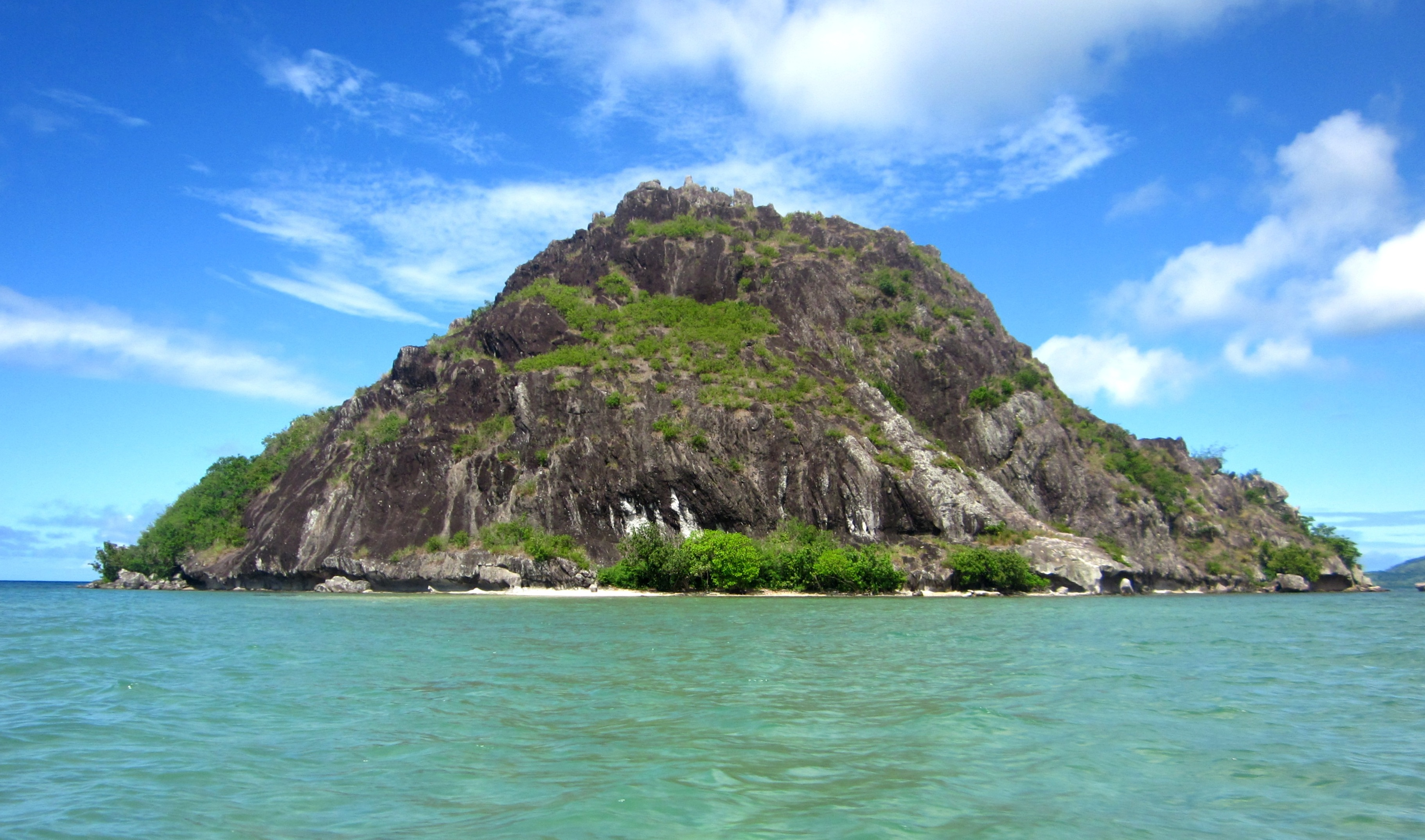
Uninhabited island off the Ra Province coast.

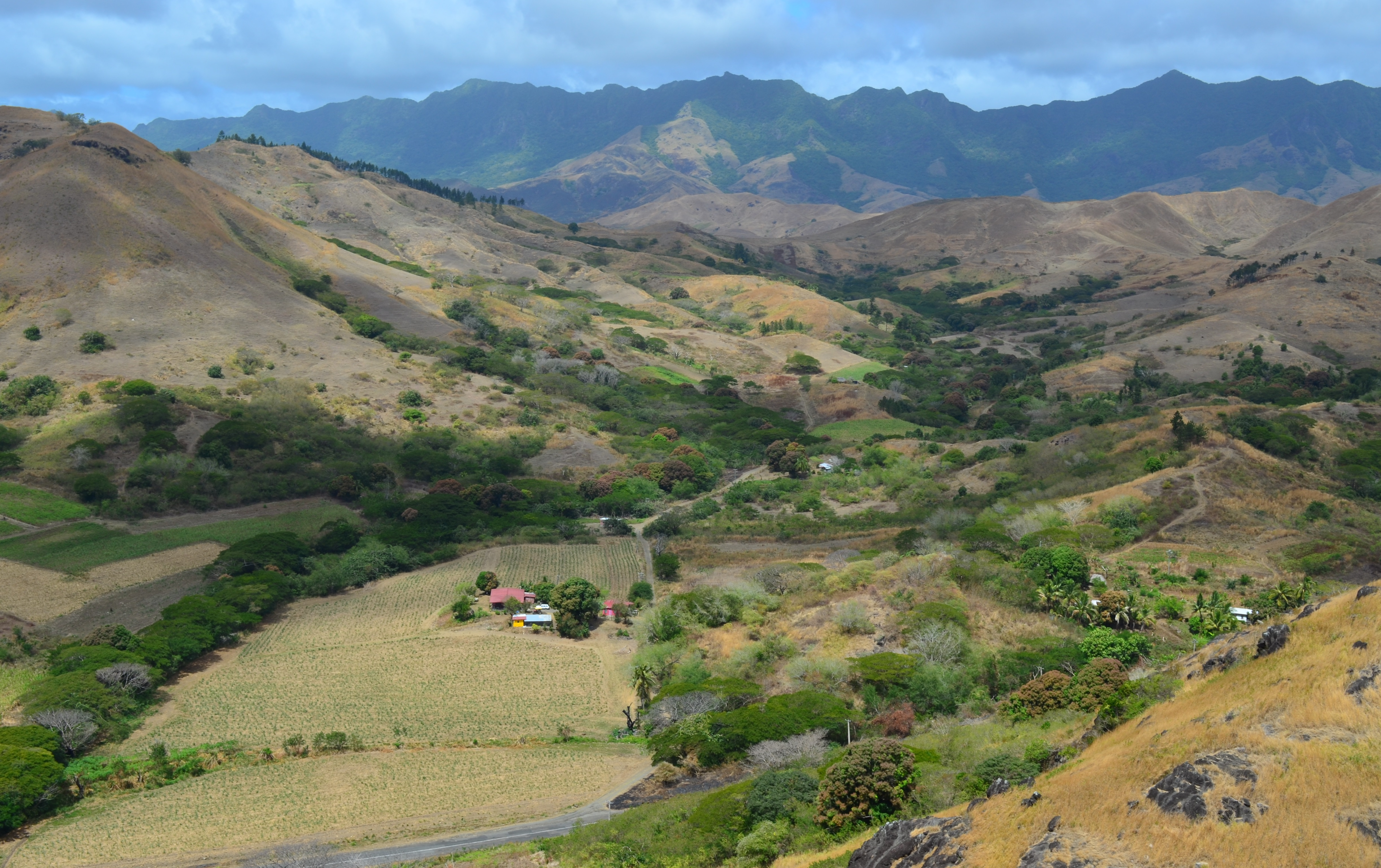
Isolated farming community in the Ra Province

Ra is one of the fourteen provinces of Fiji. Occupying the northeastern area of Viti Levu, the largest island, it is one of eight Viti Levu-based Provinces. It has a land area of 1,341 square kilometers.

== Demographics ==
Its population at the last census in 2017 was 30,416. The main urban centre is at Vaileka (or Rakiraki), with a population of 3,361 in 1996. Ra Province has 4 tikina makawa and 86 villages.

The province used to have 19 districts:

- Bureivanua
- Bureiwai
- Kavula
- Lawaki
- Mataso
- Nababa
- Nailuva
- Nakorotubu
- Nakuilava
- Nalaba
- Nalawa
- Naroko
- Nasau
- Navitilevu
- Navolau
- Rakiraki
- Raviravi
- Saivou
- Tokaimalo

The districts of Saivou, Nakorotubu, Rakiraki, and Nalawa have their own chiefs: the Gone Turaga na Vunivalu na Tui Nalawa, Turaga na Ratu ni Natauiya, Turaga na Gonesau, and Gone Turaga Tu Navitilevu.

=== 2017 Census ===
| Tikina (District) | Ethnicity | | | | | | Total |
| Tikina (District) | iTaukei | % | Indo-Fijian | % | Other | % | Total |
|---|---|---|---|---|---|---|---|
| Nakorotubu | 4,170 | 94.9 | 202 | 4.6 | 20 | 0.5 | 4,392 |
| Nalawa | 4,722 | 95.7 | 171 | 3.5 | 39 | 0.8 | 4,932 |
| Rakiraki | 7,933 | 57.0 | 5,825 | 41.9 | 150 | 1.1 | 13,908 |
| Saivou | 6,023 | 83.8 | 1,126 | 15.7 | 35 | 0.5 | 7,184 |
| Province | 22,848 | 75.1 | 7,324 | 24.1 | 244 | 0.8 | 30,415 |

Ra as a whole is governed by a Provincial Council.

The Ra dialect of Fijian is distinctive in that the consonant /t/, pronounced elsewhere in Fiji, is pronounced as a glottal stop.

== Environment ==
Conservation work in Ra has included mangrove-focused blue carbon activities at Navitilevu Bay and forest-carbon restoration initiatives in the Nakauvadra area, both linked to Conservation International Fiji.

== Christian State ==
Flag of the self-proclaimed "Ra Sovereign Christian State"

There was an attempt in 2015 to create a "Christian state" in Ra. This was described by the then Chief of Police, Ben Groenewald, as a harmless cult, but the prime minister Frank Bainimarama took a sterner view and ordered a clamp-down by the army. It was due to claims by the “cult” that the constitution of Fiji violated the UN's 2007 Declaration on the Rights of Indigenous Peoples (DOTROIP). But to ask for the UN's help, they deemed that they had to be a nation, hence The Ra Christian State was envisioned to contest the constitution. Many of the conspirators were imprisoned for sedition and treason.
