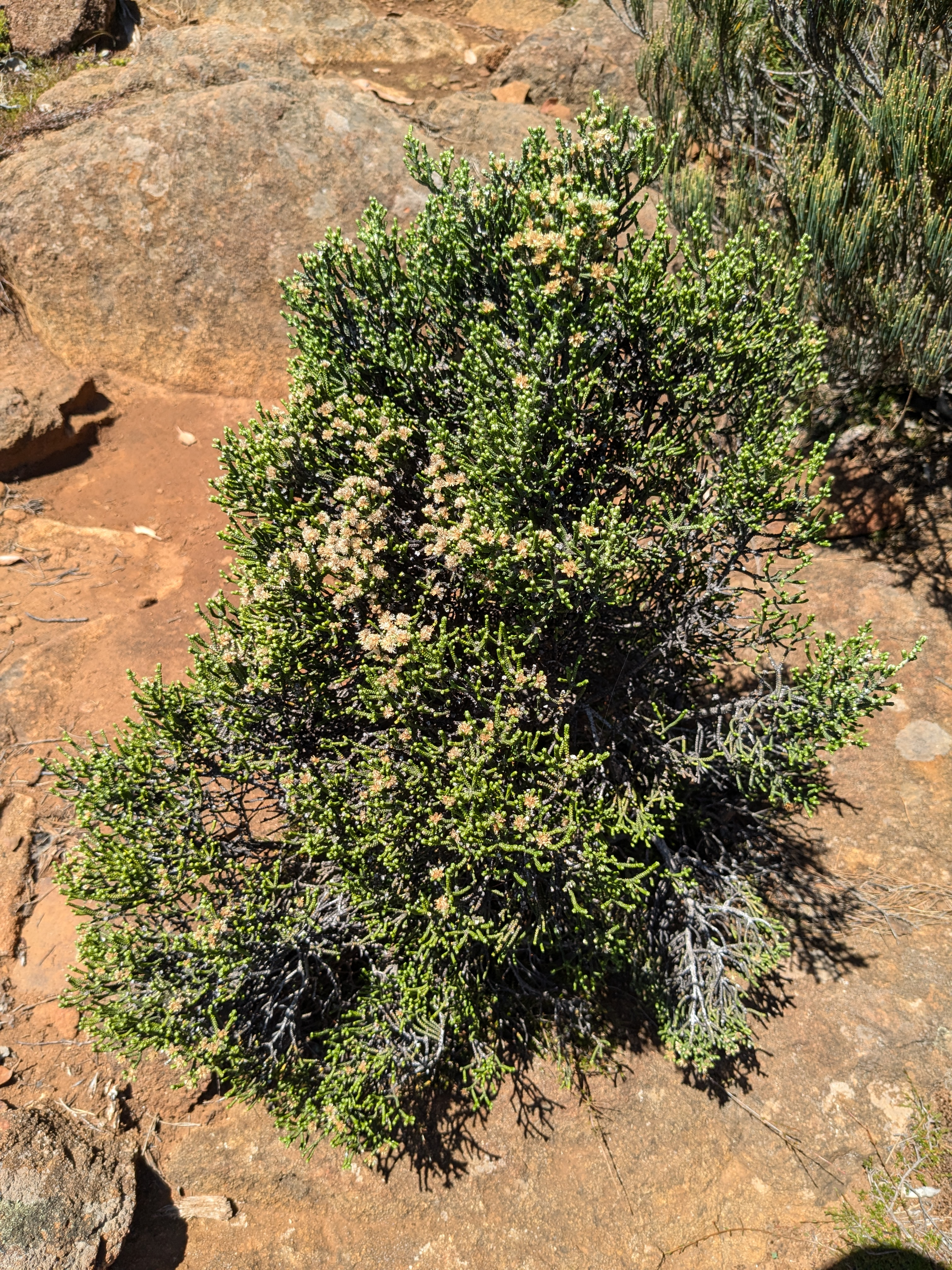
- Pictured on Cape Queen Elizabeth on Bruny Island, Tasmania

Scientific classification
- Kingdom: Plantae
- Clade: Tracheophytes
- Clade: Angiosperms
- Clade: Eudicots
- Clade: Asterids
- Order: Asterales
- Family: Asteraceae
- Genus: Ozothamnus
- Species: O. scutellifolius

Binomial name
- Ozothamnus scutellifolius Hook.f.
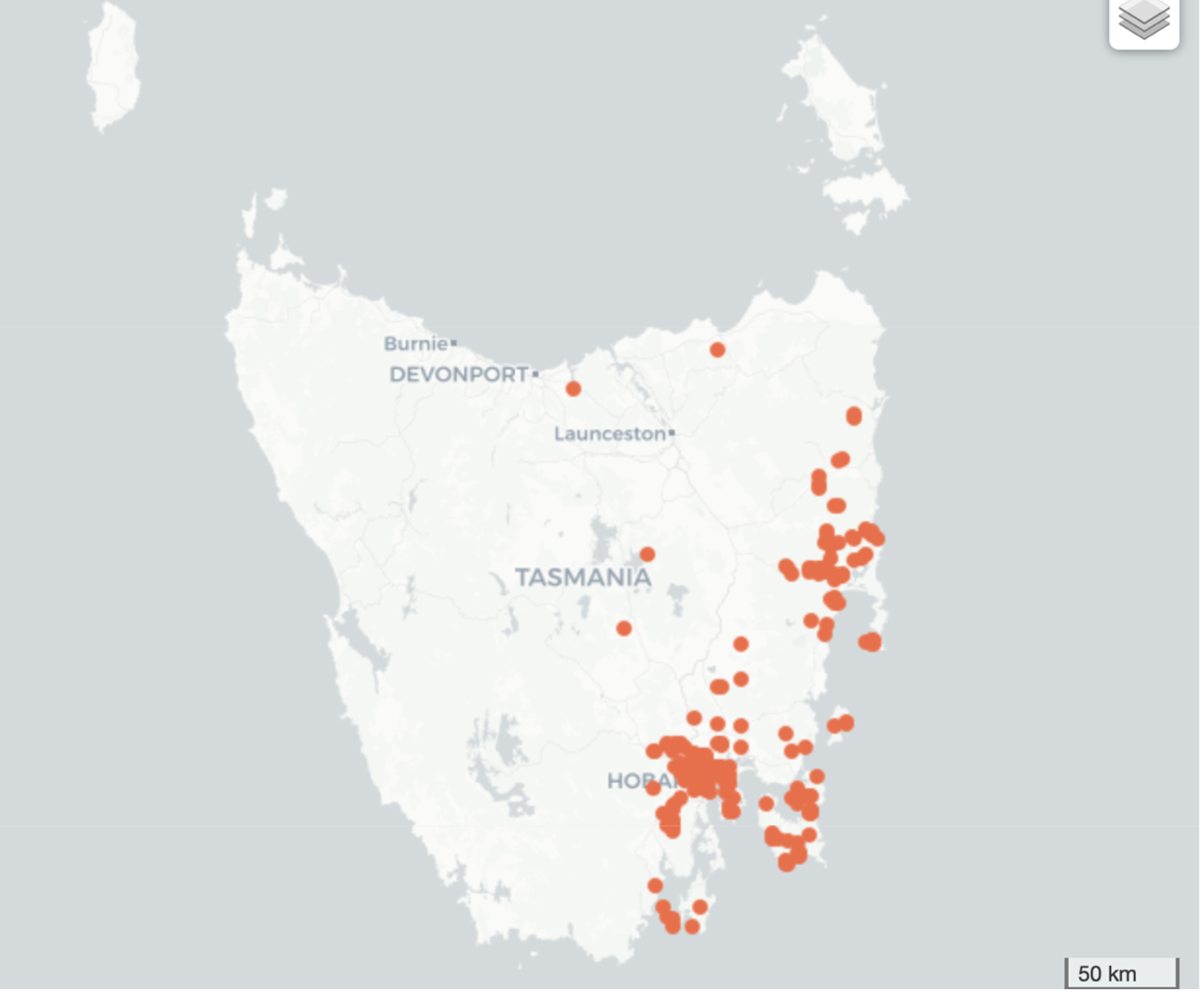
- Distribution of Ozothamnus scutellifolius

Synonyms
- Helichrysum scutellifolium (Hook.f.) Benth.

= Ozothamnus scutellifolius =

Species of flowering plant

Ozothamnus scutellifolius, commonly referred to as bush everlasting, scale-leaf everlasting or button-leaf everlasting, is a flowering plant in the family Asteraceae. This species is endemic to Tasmania, Australia, and is locally frequent on dry hillsides in the east of the state.

== Description ==
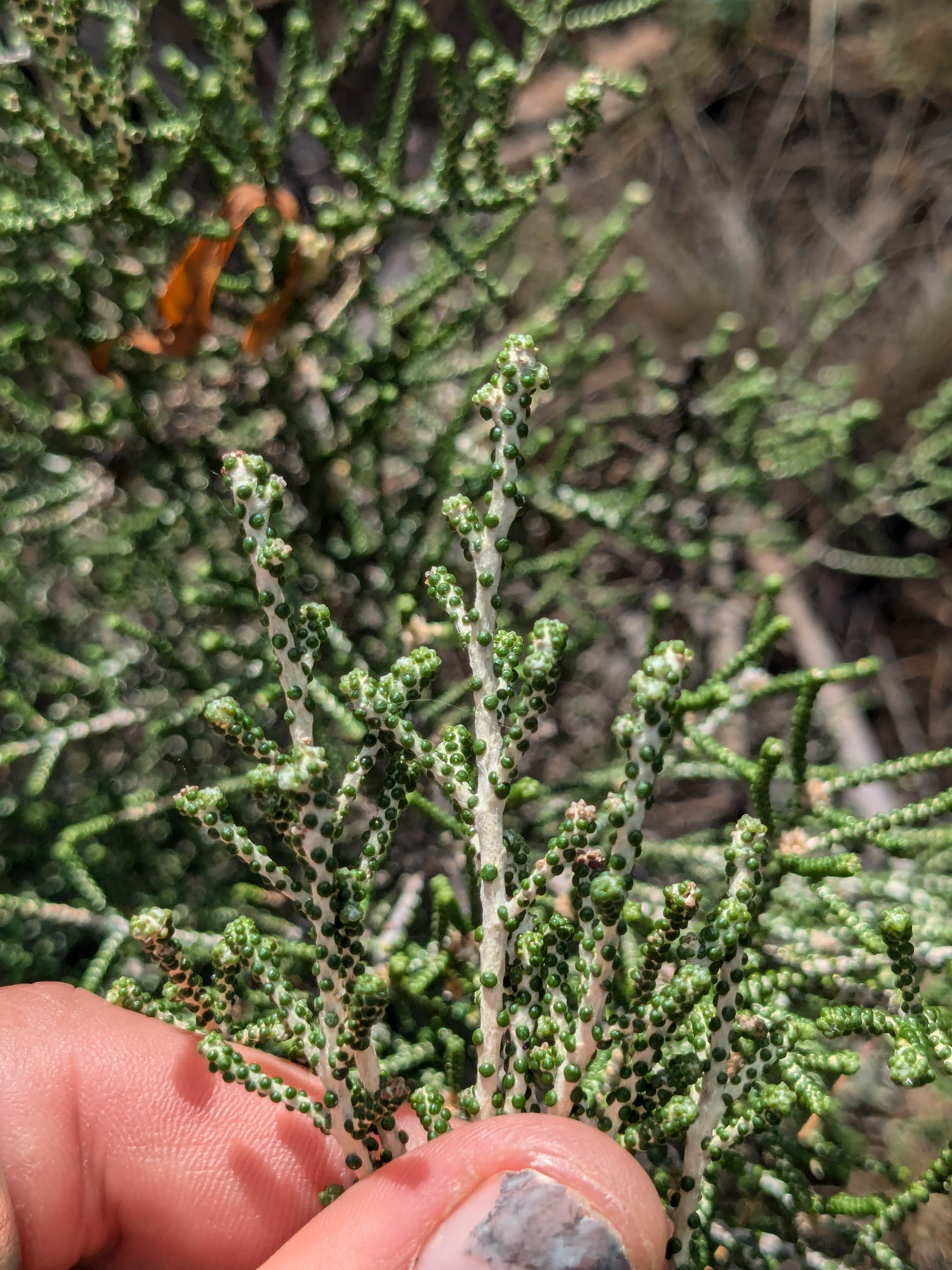
Unique Ozothamnus scutellifolius leaf morphology

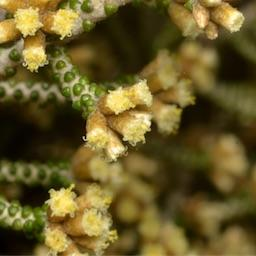
O. scutellifolius

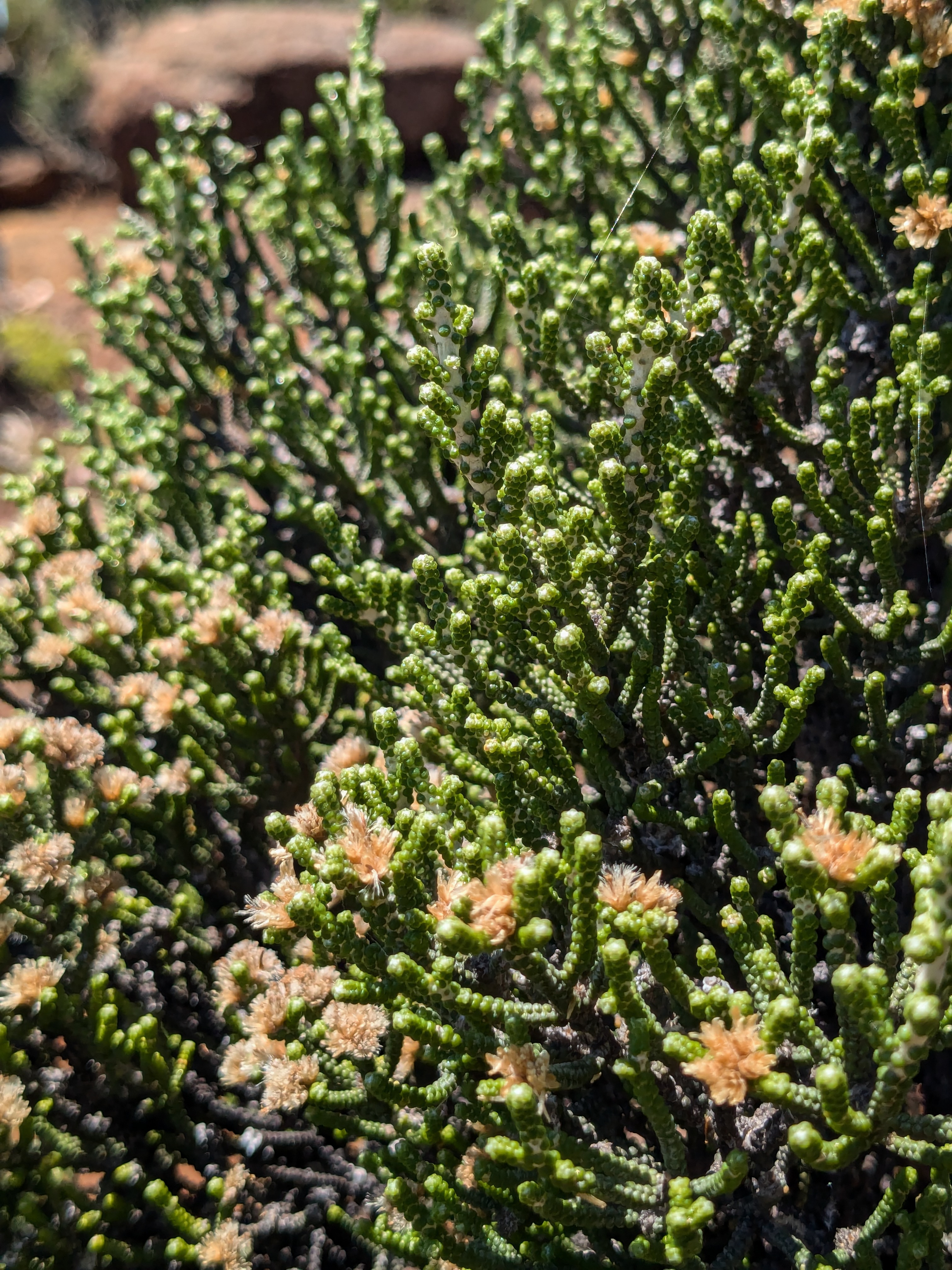
O.scutellifolius with dried older inflorescences.

Ozothamnus scutellifolius is a small shrub that grows between 0.3–1 m (1 ft 0 in – 3 ft 3 in) tall and approximately 0.5–1.5 m (1 ft 8 in – 4 ft 11 in) wide. It has a dense branching habit with the branches appearing white due to dense coverage in tiny, matted hairs (known as 'tomentose'). The small leaves (0.4–1.5 mm (0.016–0.059 in) diameter) are circular or dome-shaped and tightly pressed along the stems, giving the species its unique appearance. Leaf upper surface is often smooth and shiny, occasionally with sparse, small woolly hairs. The edges of the leaves are rolled underneath, obscuring a lightly tomentose lower surface. The inflorescence is a small cluster of three to five terminal flower heads < 5 mm (0.20 in) in length and 2–3 mm (0.08–0.12 in) across with 15-20 pale yellow/white florets. The brownish multiple layer bracts are thin and dry. Alternately, innermost bracts are white-tipped or clear. Flowering occurs from September to November. Fruits are a dry, one-seeded fruit with a leathery or membranous skin or shell which remain closed when mature, a type of achene known as cypsela. Ozothamnus scutellifolius cypselae contain tiny, rounded bumps and a tuft of hooked bristles.

This species can be confused with other members of Asteraceae; Ozothamnus hookeri, Ozothamnus reflexifolius and Olearia lepidophylla due to similarly appearing tomentose stems with small, bright green leaves. O. hookeri and O. reflexifolius have minimal distribution overlap with O. scutellifolius, reducing chances of misidentification. Although found in similar habitats, Olearia lepidophylla has single white terminal flowers as opposed to the clusters of yellow/white terminal flowers present in O. scutellifolius (see left).

== Distribution and ecology ==
Ozothamnus scutellifolius is a hardy shrub endemic to dry eucalypt woodland in well-drained soils in the east of Tasmania. Distribution ranges from St. Helens at the northern tip, south along the east coast and southern midlands to Cape Bruny on Bruny Island, with very small outlying populations scattered along the Central plateau and the northern coast. Despite local abundance, it is considered an endangered species due to its restricted global distribution.

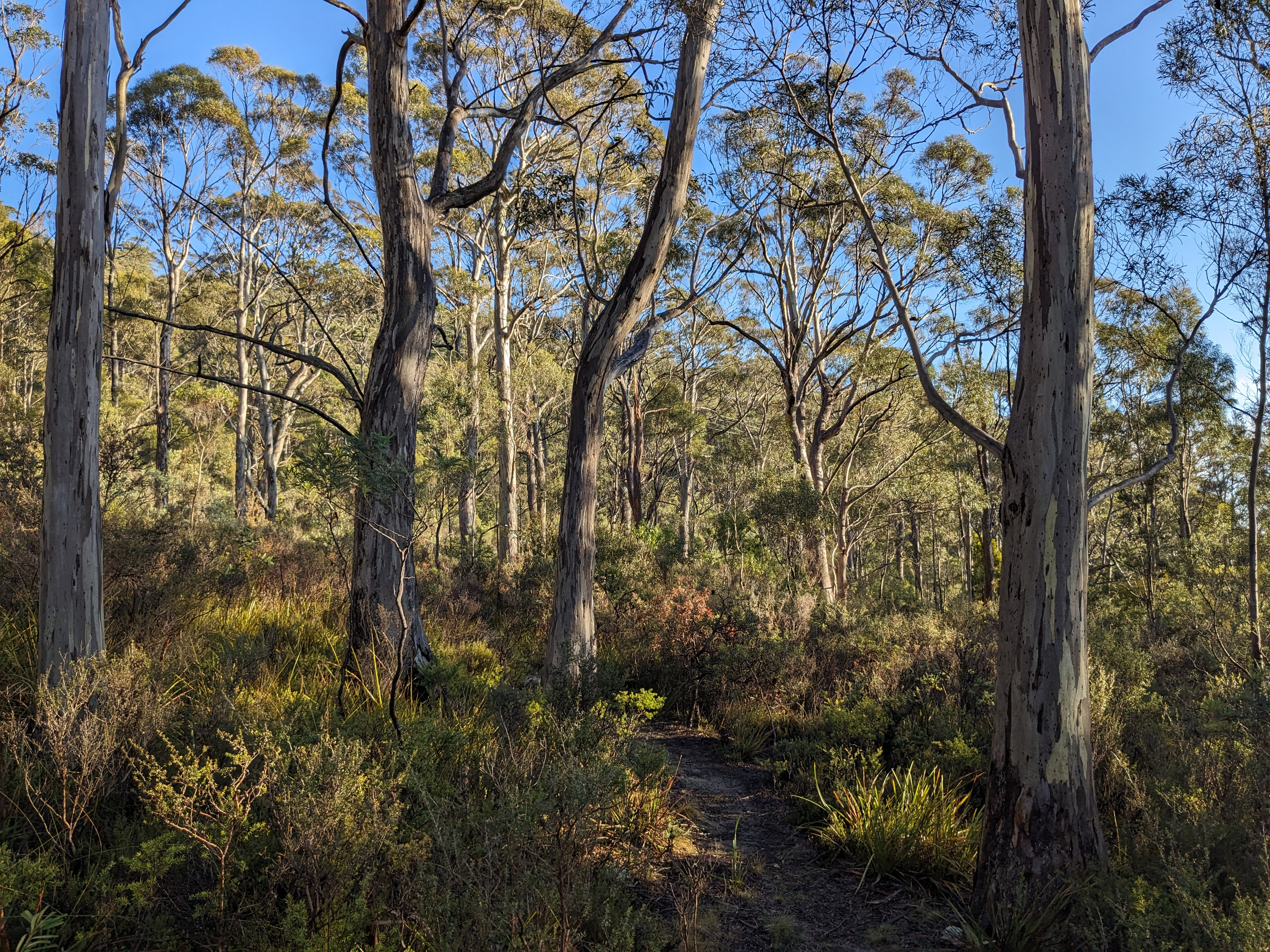
Dry eucalyptus woodland in southeast Tasmania. Typical O. scutellifolius habitat.

There is strong variation in rainfall in Tasmania with an average of ~2,000 mm (79 in) per annum in the west and only ~600 mm (24 in) in the midlands and drier parts of the east and south/east. Morphological adaptations in response to drought-prone conditions is evident in O. scutellifolius' signature small, scale-like leaves with rolled edges and abundant tomentose abaxial leaf surfaces and stems. These features in addition to thickened leaf cuticles greatly prevent evaporation and maximise water retention ensuring survival in the dryer conditions of eastern Tasmania.

O. scutellifolius can be found on a wide variety of soil types, ranging from loamy and fertile to low-phosphorus, impoverished or sandy soils. Little information is readily available regarding the ecological succession of the species, however exposure and drought-adapted traits in addition to belonging to the Asteraceae family indicates an early successional tendency in disturbed and exposed sites reinforced by the semi-frequent fire events that are common in the dry woodlands of Tasmania.

== Taxonomy ==
Previous name Helichrysum scutellifolium was revised to Ozothamnus scutellifolius in 1991 by Arne A. Anderberg. Derived from Greek 'ozo' (to smell) and 'thamnos' (shrub), with 'scutellifolius' from Latin words 'scutellum' (shield) and 'folium' (leaf).
