= Ozothamnus × expansifolius =

Scientific classification
- Kingdom: Plantae
- Clade: Tracheophytes
- Clade: Angiosperms
- Clade: Eudicots
- Clade: Asterids
- Order: Asterales
- Family: Asteraceae
- Genus: Ozothamnus
- Species: O. × expansifolius

Binomial name
- Ozothamnus × expansifolius (P.Morris & J.H.Willis) Anderb.

Species of flowering plant

Ozothamnus × expansifolius is a species of Ozothamnus. It is a small pine-like plant, it has flowers that are white or reddish-brown, and the fruit achene grows on it. The plant's habitat is on mountain slopes and heaths at altitudes of 900-1200m. It can tolerate snowfalls and it can adapt to semi-shaded or sunny places. It is a hybrid of O. ledifolius and O. hookeri. The common name of the plant is crowded-leaf everlasting.
