= Alpine everlasting =

Alpine everlasting is a common name for several plants and may refer to:

- Antennaria alpina, native to Europe and North America
- Ozothamnus alpinus, native to Australia
- Xerochrysum subundulatum, native to Australia
