= Sticky everlasting =

Sticky everlasting is a common name for several plants native to Australia and may refer to:

- Ozothamnus thyrsoideus
- Xerochrysum viscosum
