= Leucopogon ozothamnoides =

Conservation status
- Priority One — Poorly Known Taxa (DEC)

Scientific classification
- Kingdom: Plantae
- Clade: Tracheophytes
- Clade: Angiosperms
- Clade: Eudicots
- Clade: Asterids
- Order: Ericales
- Family: Ericaceae
- Genus: Leucopogon
- Species: L. ozothamnoides

Binomial name
- Leucopogon ozothamnoides Benth.
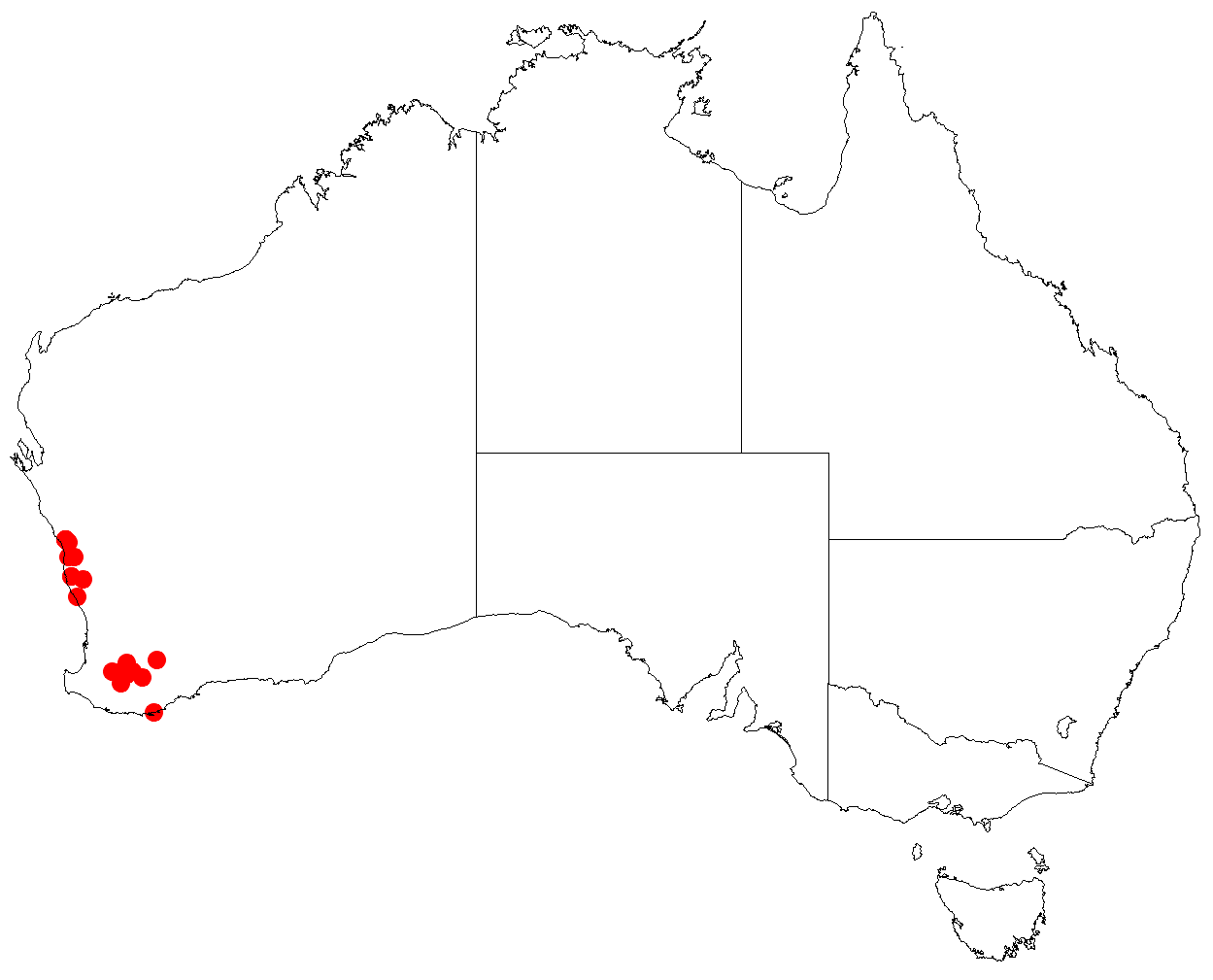
- Occurrence data from AVH

Synonyms
- Styphelia ozothamnoides (Benth.) F.Muell.

Species of plant

Leucopogon ozothamnoides is a species of flowering plant in the heath family Ericaceae and is endemic to the south-west of Western Australia. It is a weak shrub that typically grows to a height of up to about 20 cm (7.9 in). Its leaves are egg-shaped and striated, 2.0–4.2 mm (0.079–0.165 in) long and pressed closely against the stem. In other respects, it is very similar to Leucopogon fimbriatus.

The species was first formally described in 1868 by George Bentham in Flora Australiensis from specimens collected by Augustus Oldfield in a "dry sandy situation near Kinderup. The specific epithet (ozothamnoides) means "Ozothamnus-like".

Leucopogon ozothamnoides occurs in the Avon Wheatbelt and Jarrah Forest bioregions of south-western Western Australia and is listed "Priority One" by the Government of Western Australia Department of Biodiversity, Conservation and Attractions, meaning that it is known from only one or a few locations which are potentially at risk.
