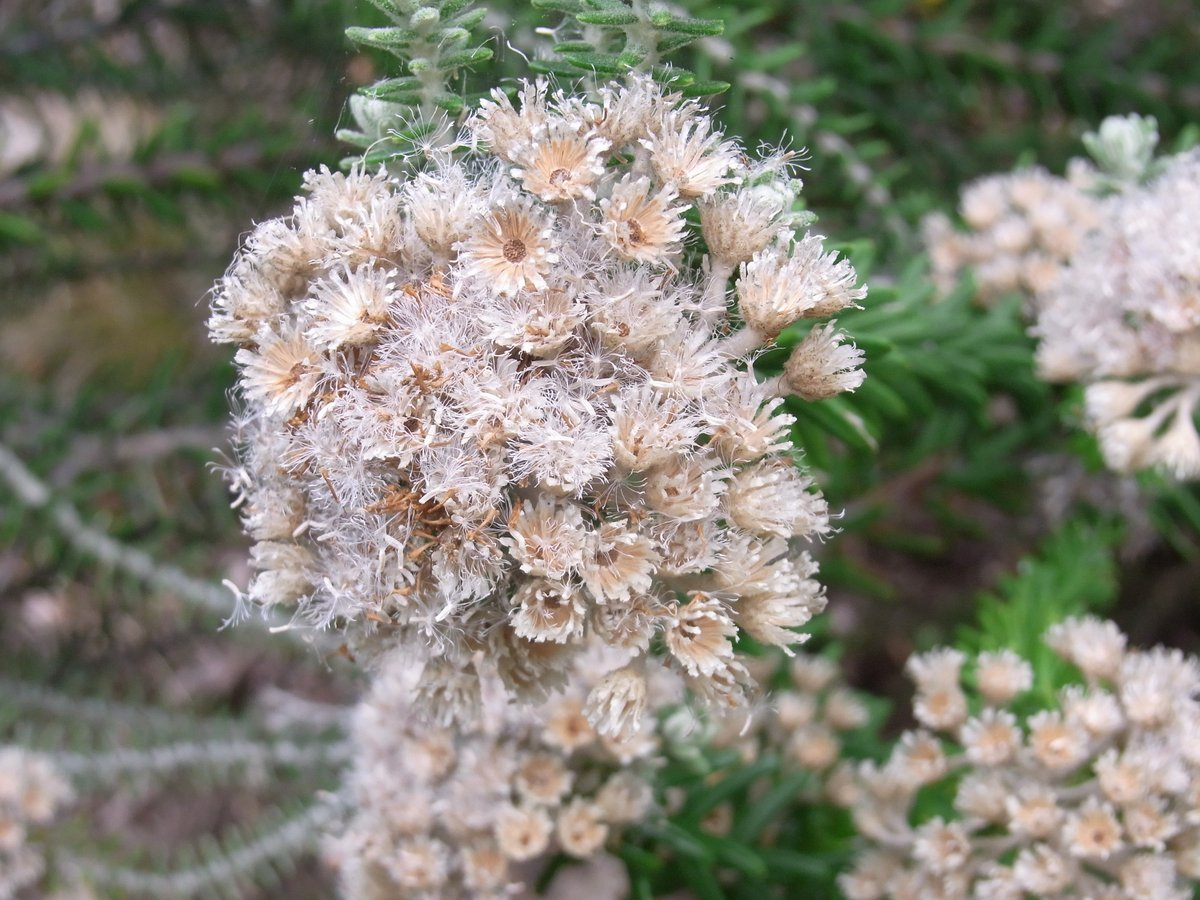

Scientific classification
- Kingdom: Plantae
- Clade: Tracheophytes
- Clade: Angiosperms
- Clade: Eudicots
- Clade: Asterids
- Order: Asterales
- Family: Asteraceae
- Genus: Ozothamnus
- Species: O. costatifructus

Binomial name
- Ozothamnus costatifructus (R.V.Sm.) Anderb.

Synonyms
- Helichrysum costatifructum

= Ozothamnus costatifructus =

Species of flowering plant

Ozothamnus costatifructus is an uncommon plant in the family Asteraceae, found in Tasmania.
