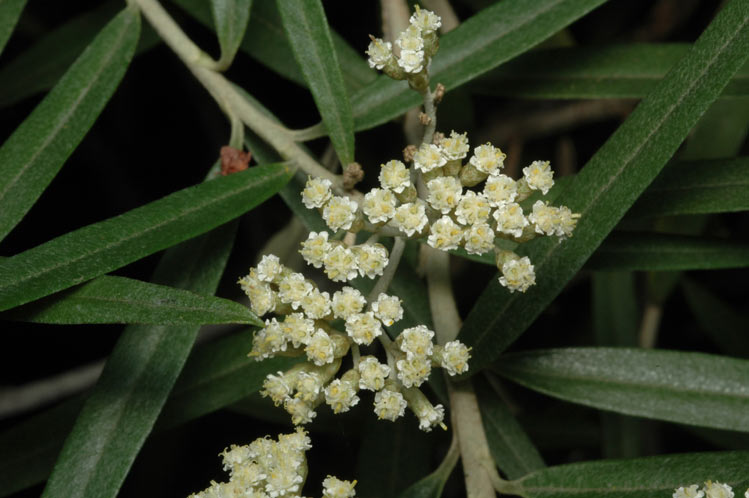

Scientific classification
- Kingdom: Plantae
- Clade: Tracheophytes
- Clade: Angiosperms
- Clade: Eudicots
- Clade: Asterids
- Order: Asterales
- Family: Asteraceae
- Genus: Ozothamnus
- Species: O. stirlingii

Binomial name
- Ozothamnus stirlingii (F.Muell.) Anderb.

= Ozothamnus stirlingii =

Ovens everlasting

Species of shrub

Ozothamnus stirlingii, commonly known as Ovens everlasting, is a flowering plant in the family Asteraceae and grows in New South Wales, Victoria and the Australian Capital Territory. It has globose-shaped white flower heads and sticky leaves.

== Description ==
Ozothamnus stirlingii is a shrub to 3 m (9.8 ft) high with covered in short, matted hairs. The leaves are elliptic to lance-shaped, 65–80 mm (2.6–3.1 in) long, 10–13 mm (0.39–0.51 in) wide, upper surface dark green, smooth and sticky. The lower surface is light green or white, sticky, covered with a dense covering of short, matted hairs and on a petiole 5–7 mm (0.20–0.28 in) long. The flower head is a corymbose arrangement, 2–7 mm (0.079–0.276 in) in diameter, almost globe-shaped, white, capitula 5.5–8 mm (0.22–0.31 in) long and 5–8 mm (0.20–0.31 in) wide and containing in excess of 70 florets. The outer bracts slightly reflexed, hard, yellowish, oval-shaped with woolly edges, inner bracts with a white lamina. Flowering occurs from November to February and the fruit is a cypsela, egg-shaped and covered with bristles about 4 mm (0.16 in) long.

== Taxonomy and naming ==
The species was described in 1889 by Ferdinand von Mueller who gave it the name Helichrysum stirlingii. In 1991 Arne A. Anderberg changed the name to Ozothamnus stirlingii and the description was published in Opera Botanica. The specific epithet (stirlingii) was in honour of Edward Charles Stirling.

== Distribution and habitat ==
Ovens everlasting grows at higher altitudes in montane forests and subalpine woodland in New South Wales, Victoria and the Australian Capital Territory.
