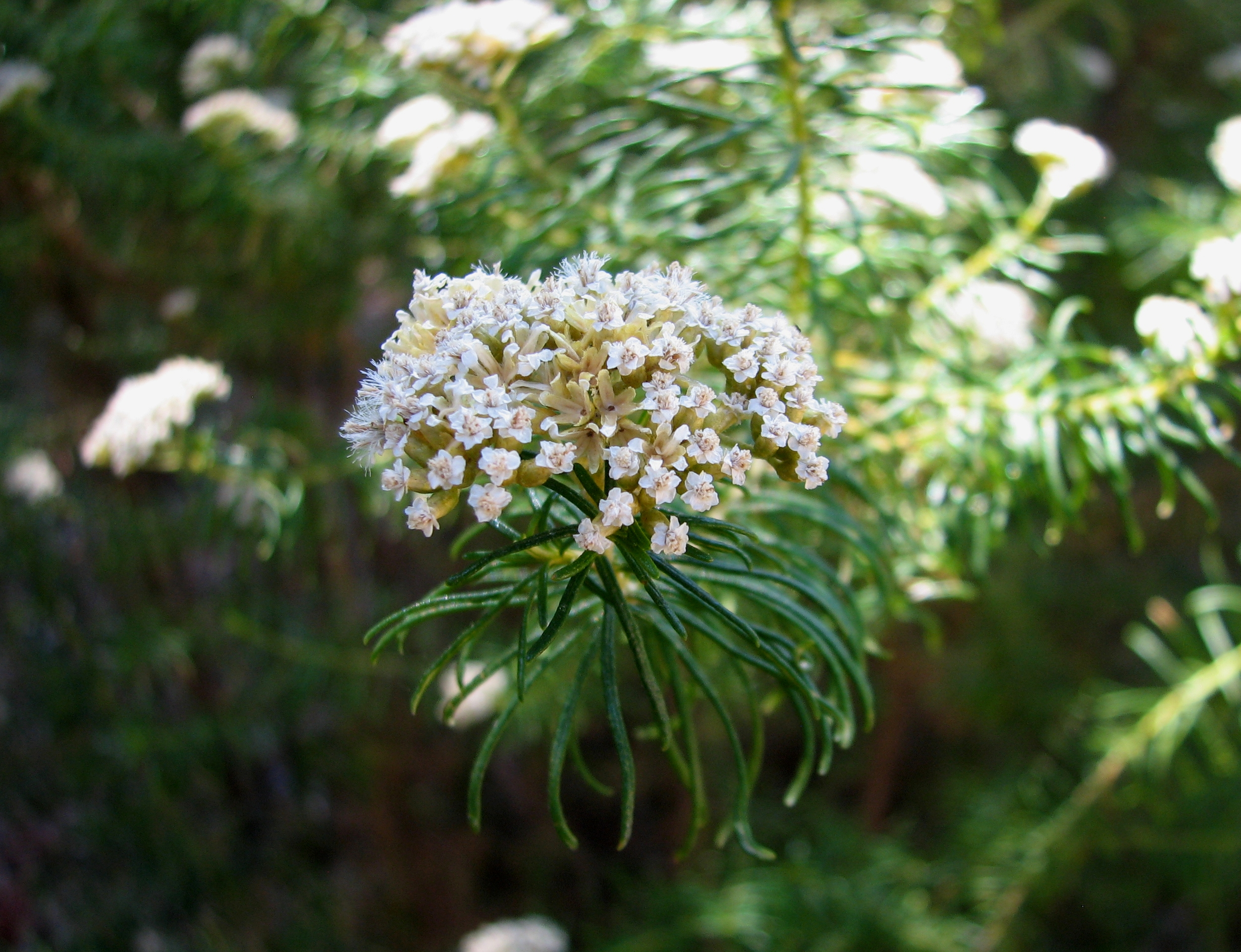

Scientific classification
- Kingdom: Plantae
- Clade: Tracheophytes
- Clade: Angiosperms
- Clade: Eudicots
- Clade: Asterids
- Order: Asterales
- Family: Asteraceae
- Genus: Ozothamnus
- Species: O. rogersianus

Binomial name
- Ozothamnus rogersianus (J.H.Willis ) Anderb.

Synonyms
- Helichrysum rogersianus J.H.Willis

= Ozothamnus rogersianus =

Species of shrub

Ozothamnus rogersianus, commonly known as Nunniong everlasting, is a shrub in the family Asteraceae. It is endemic to Victoria, Australia.

It grows to 2.5 metres high and has narrowly linear leaves that are 10 to 40 mm long and 1 to 2 mm wide. These have green upper surfaces, while underneath they are covered with fine white hairs and a sticky yellowish resin. The white flower heads appear from December to March in the species' native range.

The species was formally described in 1967 by botanist Jim Willis in Muelleria. Willis gave it the name Helichrysum rogersianum. The species epithet honours Keith Rogers of Wulgulmerang who discovered it at Brumby Point on the Nunniong Plateau in East Gippsland. In 1991, the species was transferred to the genus Ozothamnus.
