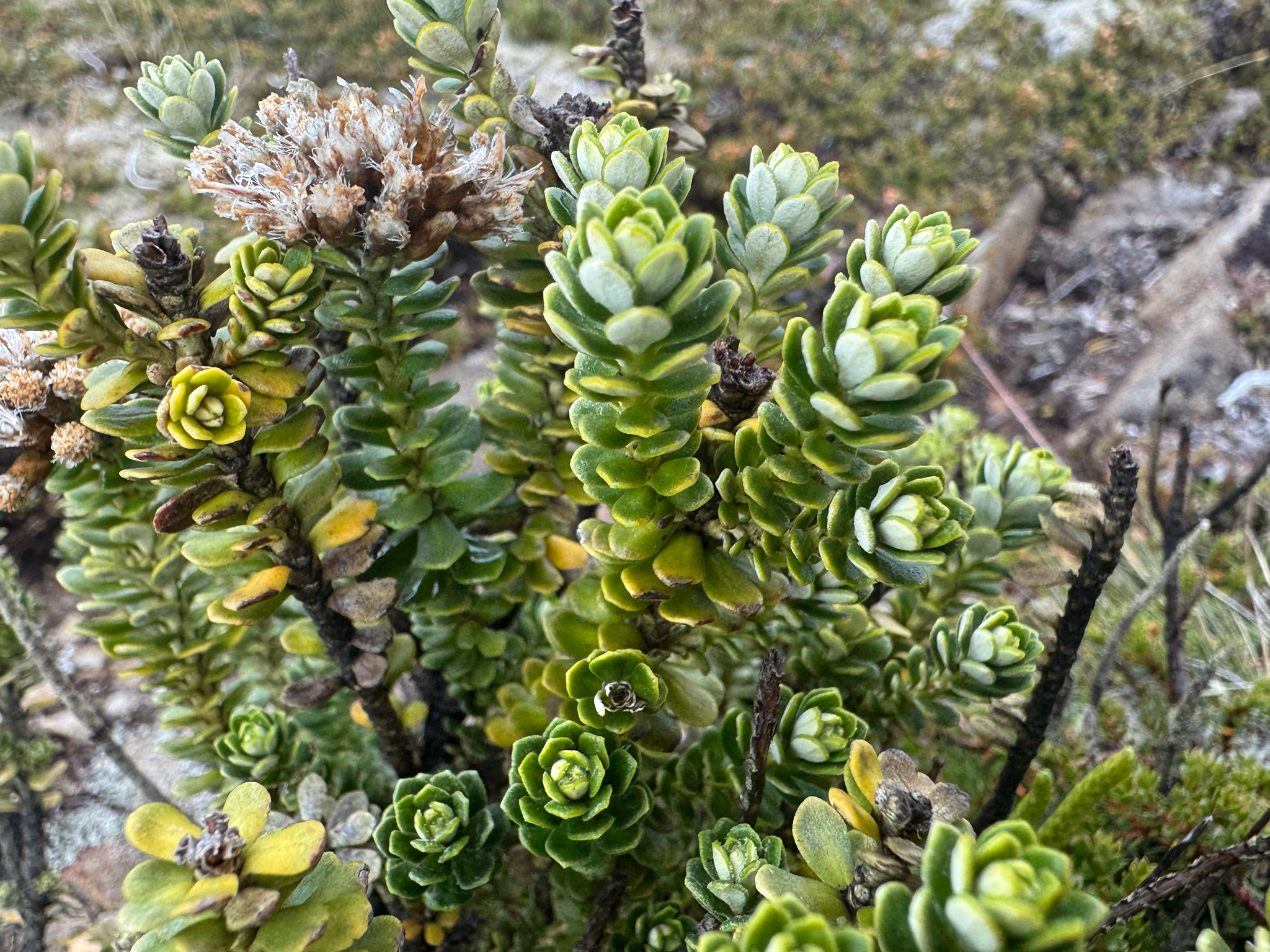

Scientific classification
- Kingdom: Plantae
- Clade: Embryophytes
- Clade: Tracheophytes
- Clade: Angiosperms
- Clade: Eudicots
- Clade: Asterids
- Order: Asterales
- Family: Asteraceae
- Genus: Ozothamnus
- Species: O. rodwayi

Binomial name
- Ozothamnus rodwayi A.E.Orchard
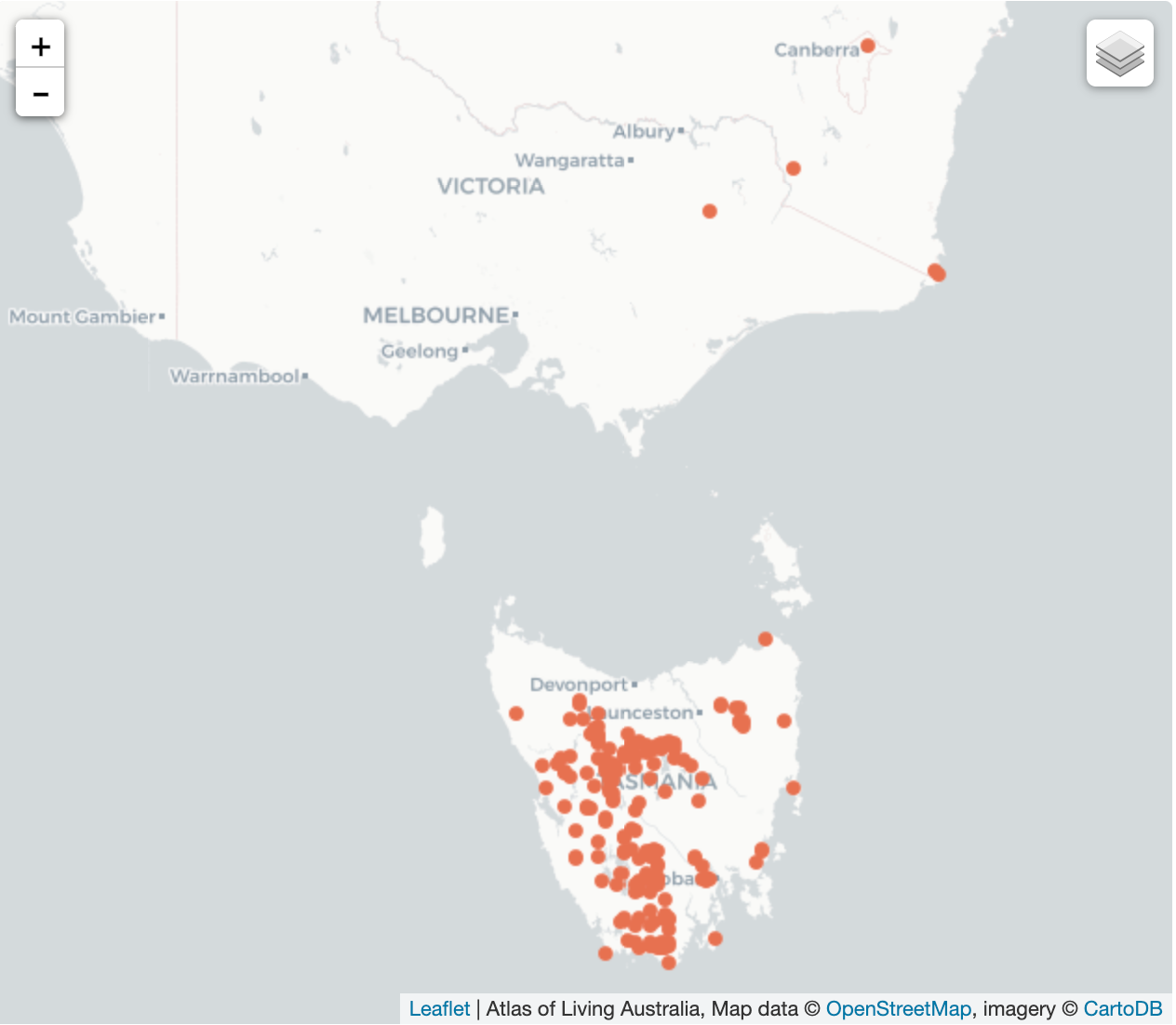
- Distribution of Ozothamnus rodwai from Atlas of Living Australia

= Ozothamnus rodwayi =

Species of flowering plant

Ozothamnus rodwayi, commonly known as alpine everlastingbush (and formerly known as Helichrysum backhousii), is a species of flowering plant in the family Asteraceae that is endemic to Tasmania, Australia. It is a widespread small, dense alpine shrub abundantly found in alpine and high subalpine heaths and woodlands.

== Description ==
Ozothamnus rodwayi is a small and compact, highly-branched rounded shrub in the family Asteraceae, and is one of 54 species from the genus Ozothamnus. Typically it grows 50–100 cm (20–39 in) in height and 50–80 cm (20–31 in) in width. Ozothamnus rodwayi is distinguished from other members of its genus by its tiny (7–15 mm long), grey/green leaves with a densely hairy-white underside, that are obovate and alternately arranged. Young foliage of the plant has a slightly sticky feel. Like other members of the family Asteraceae it has white daisy flowers; these are arranged in compact terminal, profuse clusters, and are distinguished by brown hairy bracts. As with all members of the family Asteraceae, its fruit is a cypsela; these have two fused carpels yet only one locule, which produces one seed per formed fruit.

== Taxonomy ==
=== Species variations ===
There 3 species variations of Ozothamnus rodwayi which are currently recognised by the Australian Plant Census:

- Ozothamnus rodwayi var. kingii, silvery alpine everlastingbush, distinguished by its silver foliage.
- Ozothamnus rodwayi var. oreophilus, eastern alpine everlastingbush, distinguished by dark green leaves.
- Ozothamnus rodwayi var. rodwayi, alpine everlastingbush.

== Habitat and distribution ==
Ozothamnus rodwayi is widespread and abundant in areas of high altitude throughout Tasmania, Australia, to which it is endemic. It is common on exposed alpine slopes to subalpine heath and woodlands, such as at Cradle Mountain-Lake St Clair National Park, Mount Field National Park and throughout the Central Highlands (Tasmania).

== Cultivation ==
Requires full sun in moist, well drained soil with a high humus content. Ozothamnus rodwayi can be used as an attractive shrubbery, rockery or container plant and can be propagated from seedling or cuttings.

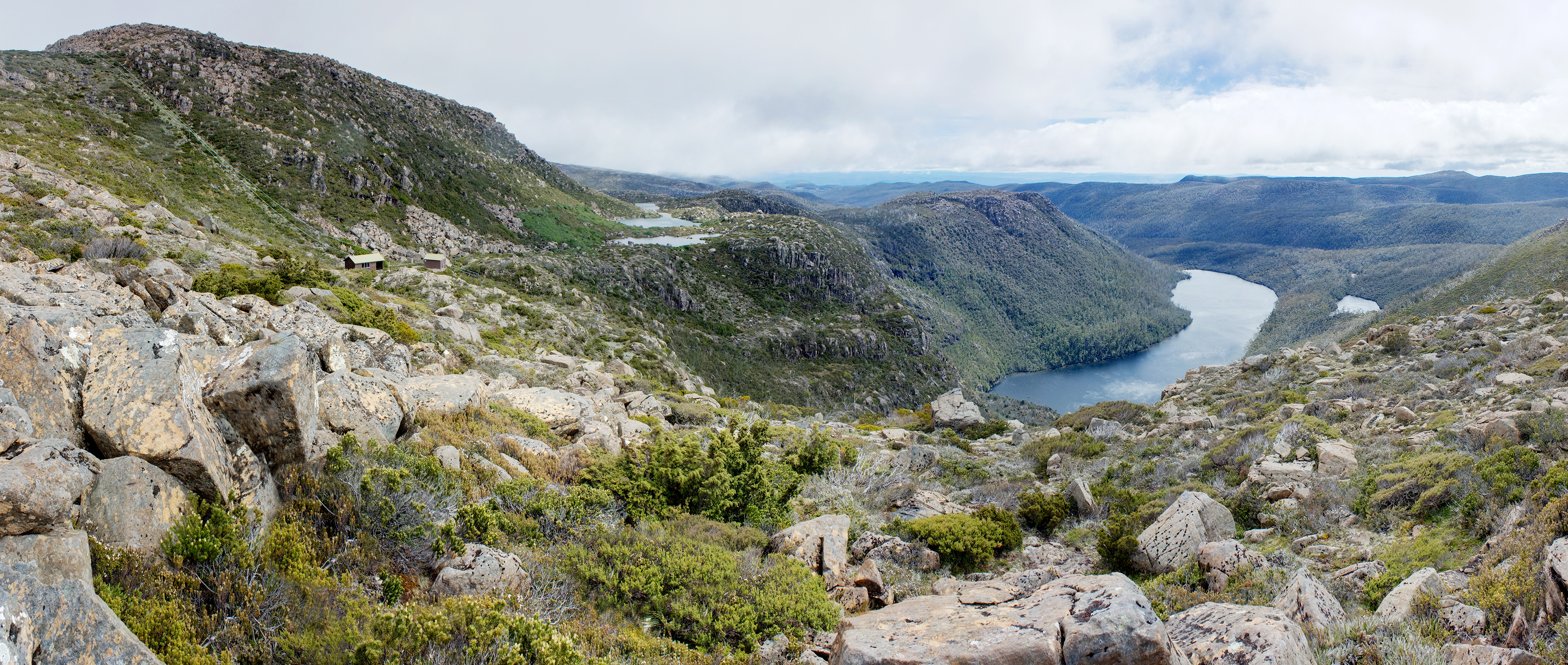
Typical alpine coniferous heath at the Tarn Shelf in Mt Field National Park, Tasmania, where Ozothamnus rodwayi is found
