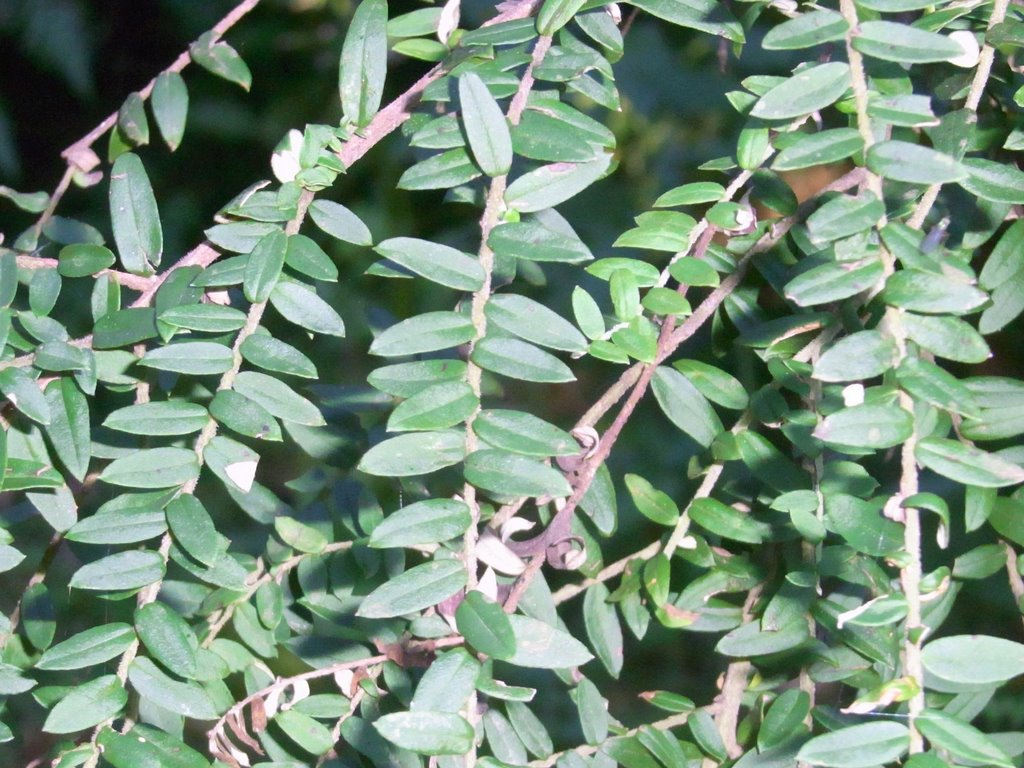
- League scrub, Australia

Scientific classification
- Kingdom: Plantae
- Clade: Tracheophytes
- Clade: Angiosperms
- Clade: Eudicots
- Clade: Asterids
- Order: Asterales
- Family: Asteraceae
- Genus: Ozothamnus
- Species: O. rufescens

Binomial name
- Ozothamnus rufescens DC.

Synonyms
- Helichrysum rufescens (DC.) N.T.Burb

= Ozothamnus rufescens =

Species of shrub

Ozothamnus rufescens is an Australian shrub in the family Asteraceae, native to the states of New South Wales and Queensland. Usually seen on the edges of rainforests, up to 4 metres in height. The southernmost point of its natural distribution is near Muswellbrook, New South Wales.

This plant first appeared in scientific literature in the year 1838, in the Prodromus Systematis Naturalis Regni Vegetabilis authored by the Swiss botanist Augustin Pyramus de Candolle.
