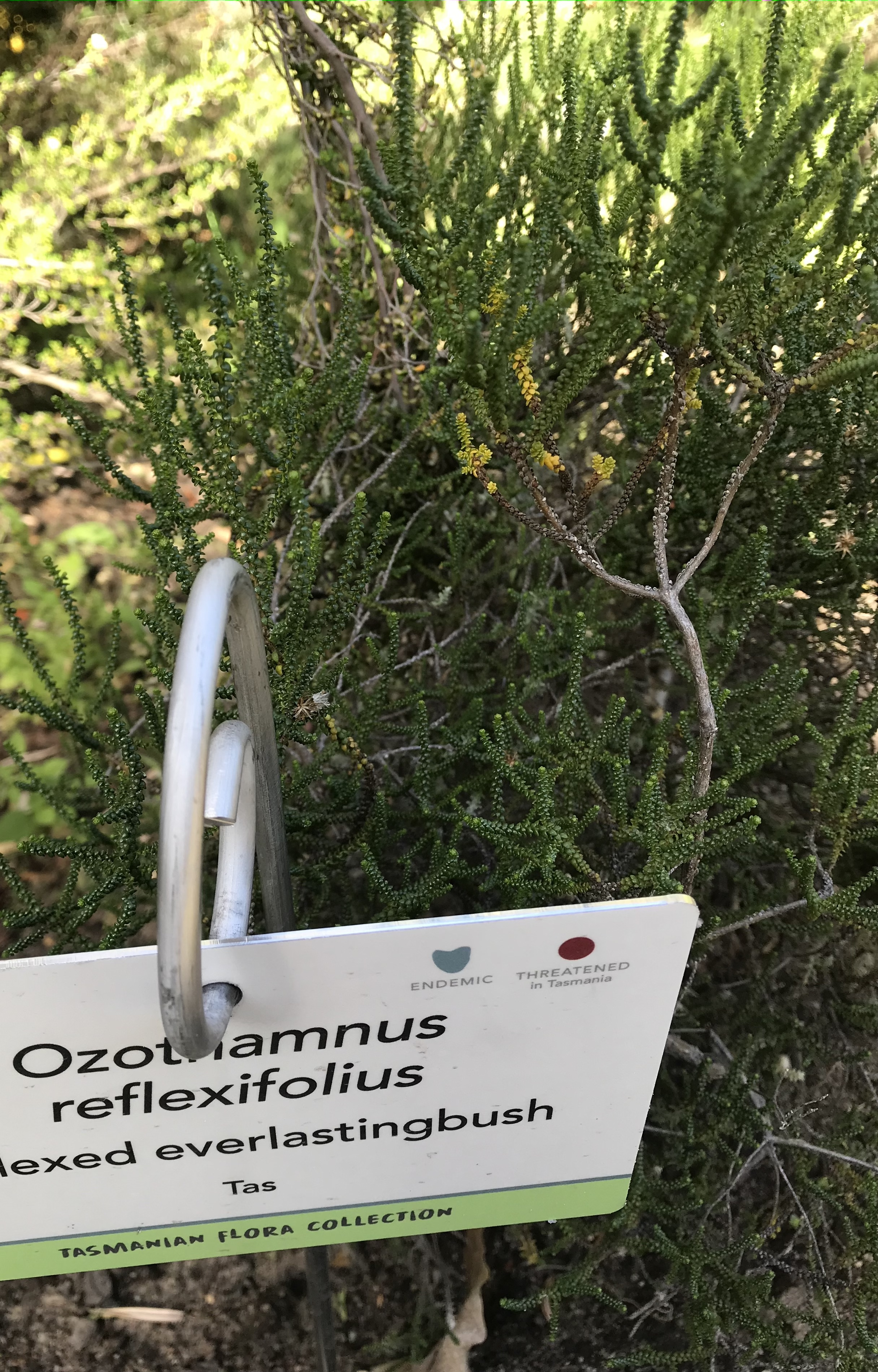
- Ozothamnus reflexifolius Royal Tasmanian Botanic Gardens, Tasmania

Scientific classification
- Kingdom: Plantae
- Clade: Tracheophytes
- Clade: Angiosperms
- Clade: Eudicots
- Clade: Asterids
- Order: Asterales
- Family: Asteraceae
- Genus: Ozothamnus
- Species: O. reflexifolius

Binomial name
- Ozothamnus reflexifolius Leeson & Rozefelds

= Ozothamnus reflexifolius =

Species of flowering plant

Ozothamnus reflexifolius, commonly known as reflexed everlastingbush, is a flowering plant in the family Asteraceae. It is known from only a single population in the Meehan Range, south-eastern Tasmania. It is thought to be closely related to O. lycopodioides and O. selaginoides.

== Description ==
Ozothamnus reflexifolius usually grows to between 0.5–1.3 m (1 ft 8 in – 4 ft 3 in) high, branches slender and spreading. The leaves are closely arranged, alternate, and sessile, bright green, glabrous, 1.0–2.2 mm (0.039–0.087 in) long, 1.0–1.4 mm (0.039–0.055 in) wide, strongly reflexed and parallel to the stem in older growth. The reflexed portion of the leaf is broadly ovate to orbicular, 0.7–1.2 mm (0.028–0.047 in) long, 1.0–1.4 mm (0.039–0.055 in) wide, the strongly reflexed mature leaves differentiating O. reflexifolius from O. lycopodioides and O. selaginoides. The inflorescence is cream to yellowish, hemispherical, 1.0–1.5 cm (0.39–0.59 in) diameter, without stalks, grouped in clusters of five to eight at the ends of the branches, and overtopped by the branches arising immediately below the inflorescences. Flowering occurs from November to March and the fruits are cylindric shaped cypsela, 1.0 mm (0.039 in) long, small and dry with a tuft of barbed bristles at the apex. Seeds are highly fecund and germinate readily although have a short period of viability.

== Conservation status ==
Ozothamnus reflexifolius is listed as vulnerable under the Environment Protection and Biodiversity Conservation Act 1999 and the Threatened Species Protection Act 1995 (Tasmania).

== Taxonomy and naming ==
The species was described in 2003 by Kevin E Leeson and Andrew C Rozefelds after discovery in 2000 by Richard Schahinger. O. reflexifolius is named for the reflexed appearance of the adult leaves.

== Distribution and habitat ==
The species is endemic to the Meehan Range, south-eastern Tasmania, occurring on skeletal soils derived from Jurassic dolerite. The population of 4000-5000 mature plants occupies 2 ha within an area of 4-5 ha. The plants occur as either an understory shrub in Allocasuarina forest, co-dominant in open heath with Spyridium obovatum var. velutinum, or as a component of dolerite rock face vegetation. The restriction of the species to a single population is thought to be a combination of biological attributes, site attributes, and fire disturbance.
