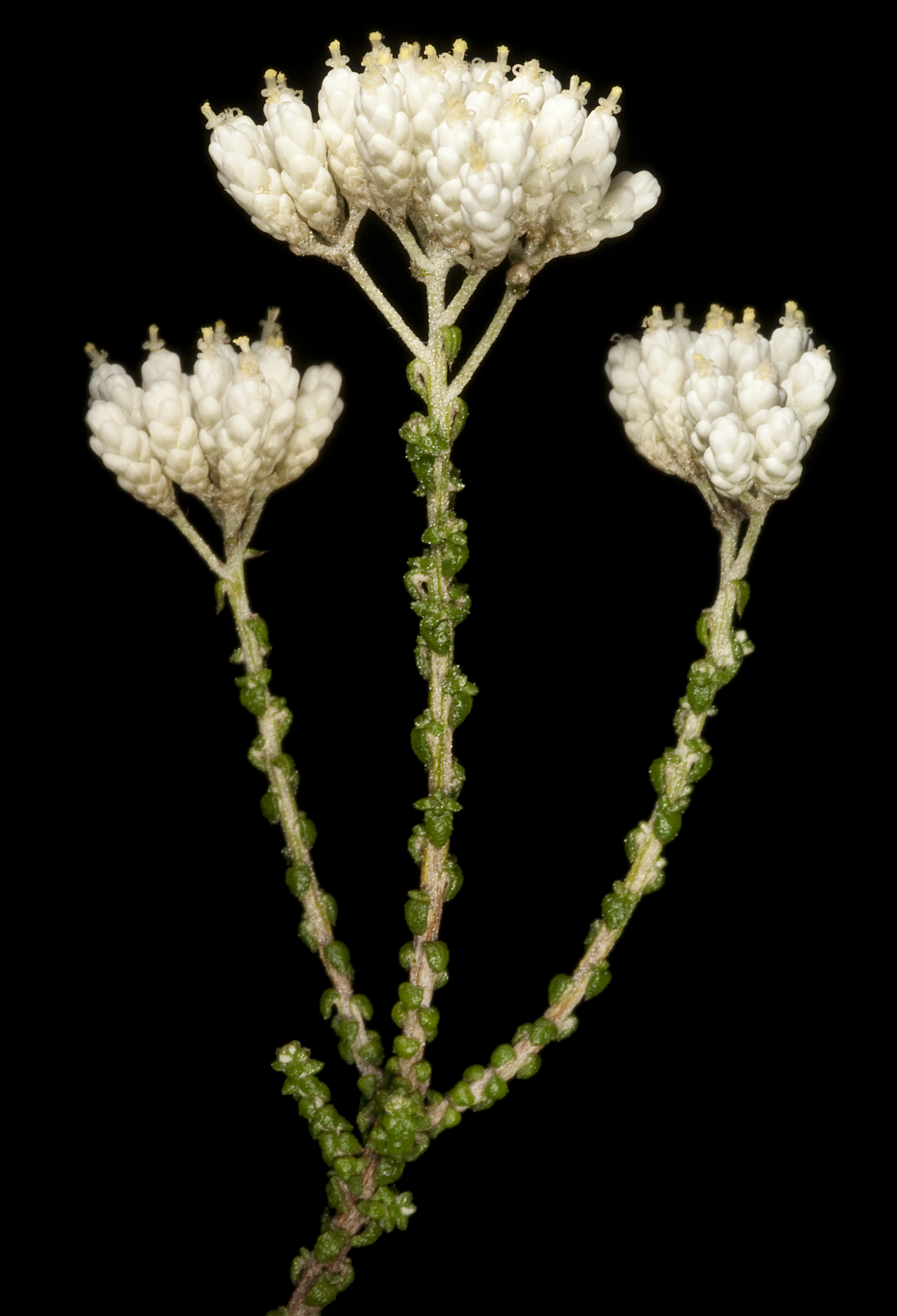

Scientific classification
- Kingdom: Plantae
- Clade: Tracheophytes
- Clade: Angiosperms
- Clade: Eudicots
- Clade: Asterids
- Order: Asterales
- Family: Asteraceae
- Genus: Ozothamnus
- Species: O. lepidophyllus

Binomial name
- Ozothamnus lepidophyllus Steetz

Synonyms
- Cassinia rubra Buchanan; Helichrysum lepidophyllum F.Muell. ex Benth. Helichrysum steetzianum Tovey & P.Morris

= Ozothamnus lepidophyllus =

Species of plant

Ozothamnus lepidophyllus (common name scaly-leaved everlasting) is a shrub in the family Asteraceae, native to Western Australia. It is erect, growing from 0.25 to 0.6 m high with white flowers and grows on loamy, sandy and rocky soils.

The species was described in 1845 by German botanist Joachim Steetz.
