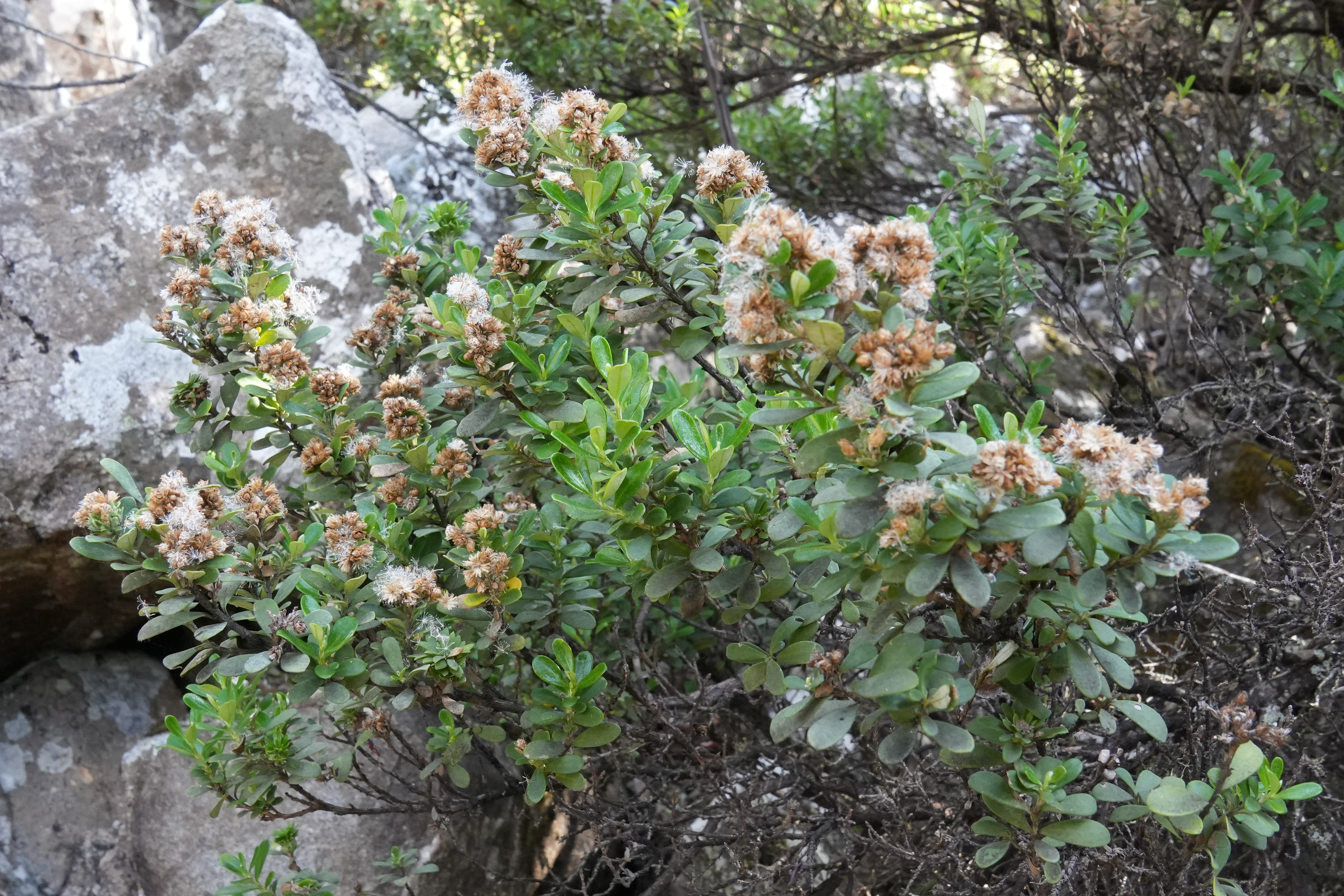

Scientific classification
- Kingdom: Plantae
- Clade: Tracheophytes
- Clade: Angiosperms
- Clade: Eudicots
- Clade: Asterids
- Order: Asterales
- Family: Asteraceae
- Genus: Ozothamnus
- Species: O. antennaria

Binomial name
- Ozothamnus antennaria (DC.) Hook.fil.
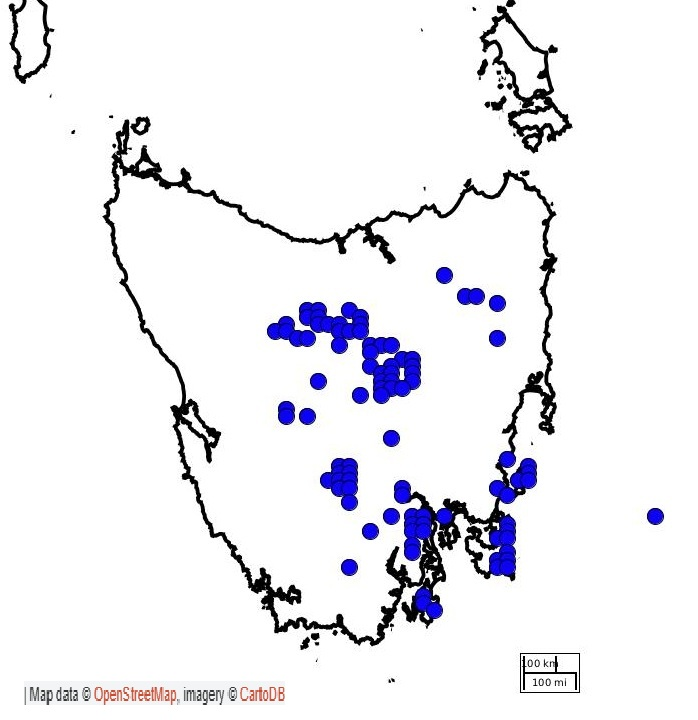
- Distribution of Ozothamnus antennaria

= Ozothamnus antennaria =

Species of flowering plant

Ozothamnus antennaria, commonly known as the sticky everlasting bush, is a shrub endemic to Tasmania, Australia.

Derivation of Name: Ozothamnus from Greek ozo, to smell and thamnos, a shrub, referring to the smelly foliage.

== Description ==
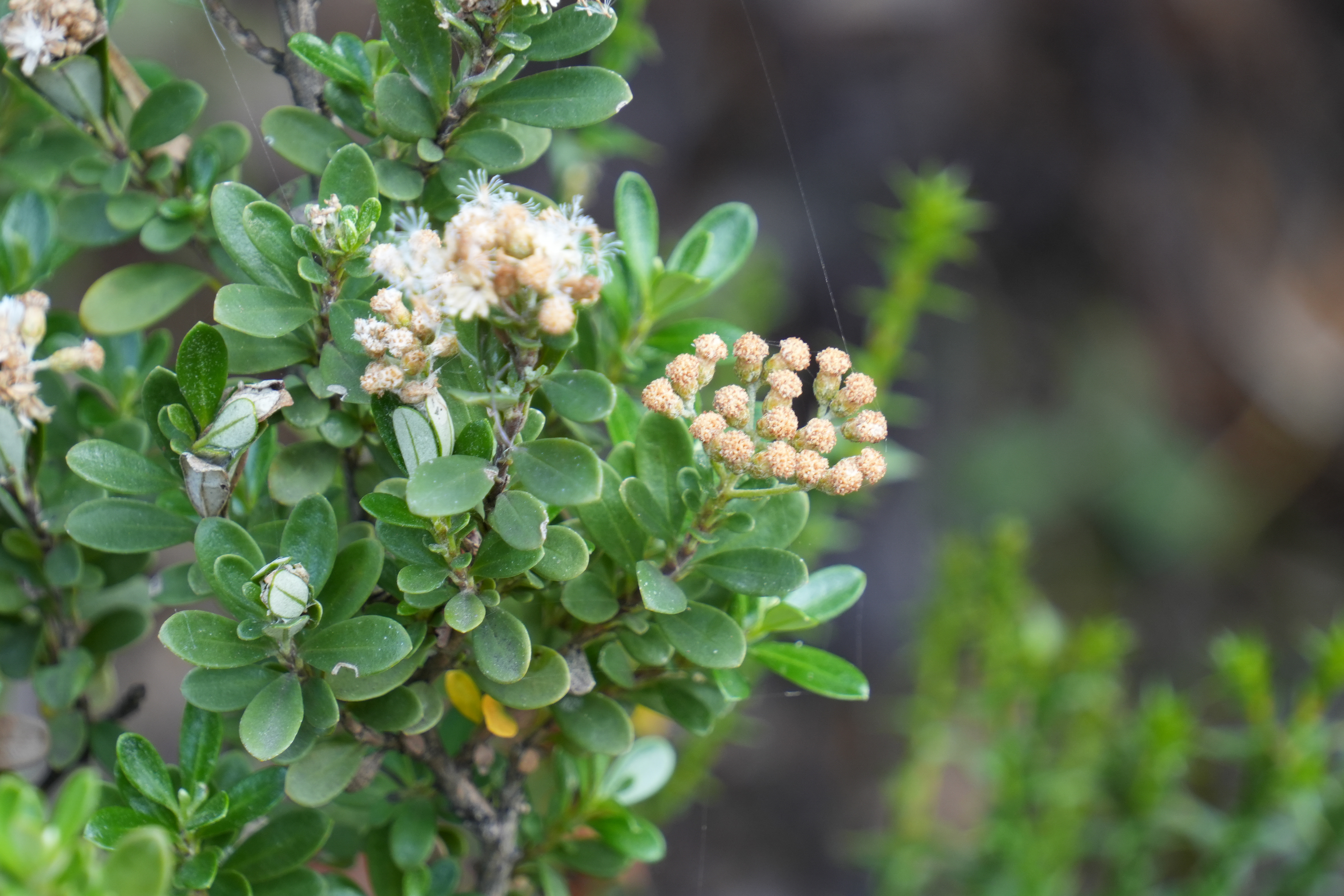
Ozothamnus antennaria

Ozothamnus antennaria is an erect shrub, typically reaching between 1 and 2 m (3.3 and 6.6 ft) in height. The leaves are simple, oblanceolate to obovate, often with narrowly recurved margins and measuring 1–3 cm (0.39–1.18 in) in length and 4–10 mm (0.16–0.39 in) in width. The upper surface is green and somewhat sticky, while the lower surface is paler and covered with a fine layer of small hairs. The flower heads are arranged in corymbose panicles terminating the main stems and lateral branches. The involucre is turbinate, 4.5–5.0 mm (0.18–0.20 in) long, with scarious phyllaries that are pale brown; the innermost phyllaries have short white tips that are not, or scarcely, spreading. Each head contains 20–28 florets that are longer than the involucre. The achenes are pubescent, and the pappus bristles are slender but thickened at the tips.

The crowded off-white flowers of O. antennaria, contrasting with its bright green leaves, are distinguishing features. These characteristics, along with its sticky young leaves and resinous exudate on the lower leaf surface, help differentiate it from similar species within the Ozothamnus genus. It can be distinguished from similar species from other genus's such as Olearia persoonioides by the lack of ray florets.

== Habitat and distribution ==
Ozothamnus antennaria is endemic to Tasmania, it is a wet forest shrub, widespread and common on rocky hillsides at elevations ranging from 100 to 1,000 m (330 to 3,280 ft). Especially on Mount Wellington / kunanyi and the central mountains.

The seeds of O.antennaria are equipped with a pappus which is used for long distance wind dispersal.

== Cultivation ==
Although not widely cultivated, Ozothamnus antennaria can be propagated from fresh seed or tip cuttings.
