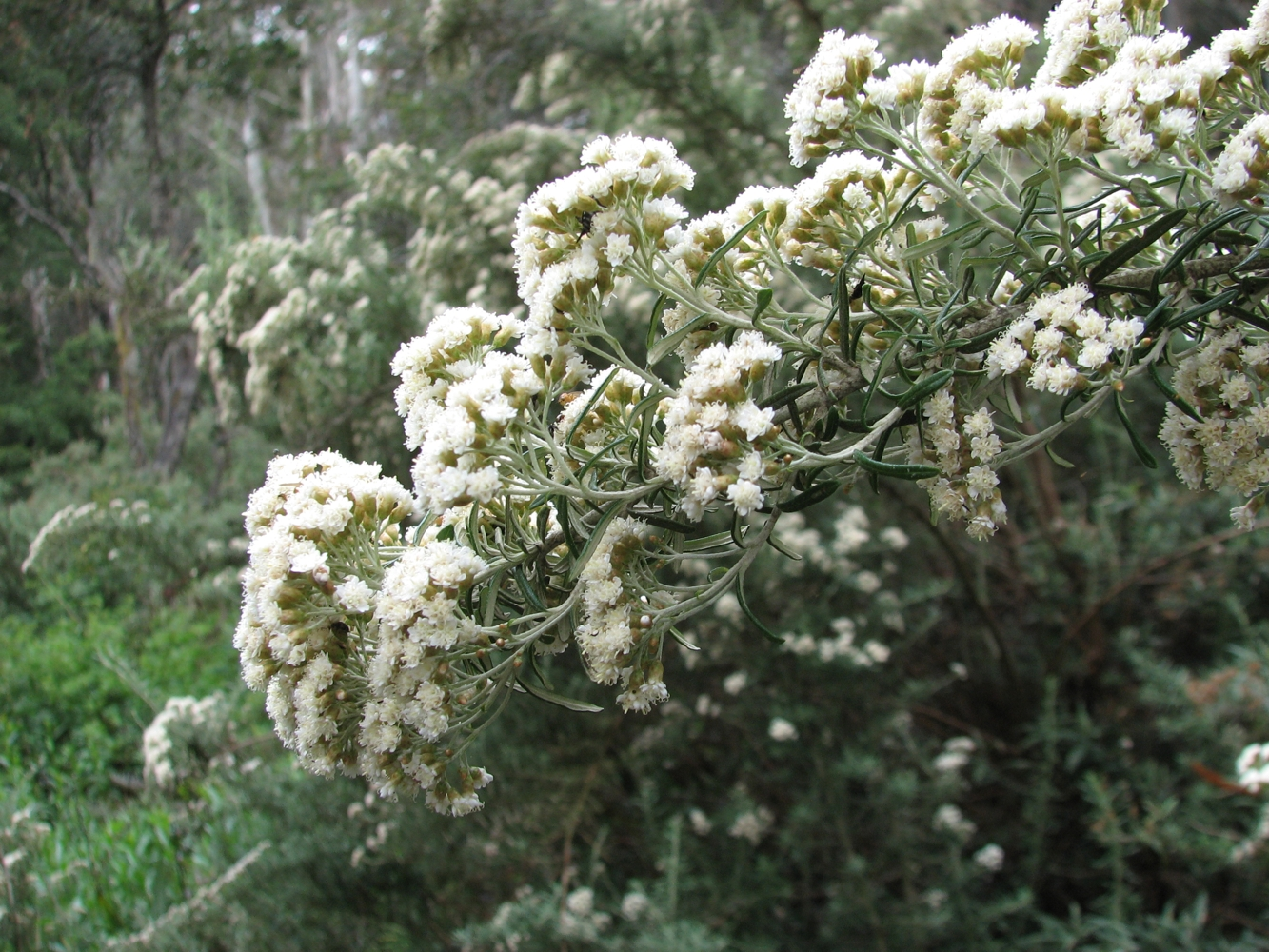
- Ozothamnus secundiflorus at Mount Donna Buang, Victoria

Scientific classification
- Kingdom: Plantae
- Clade: Tracheophytes
- Clade: Angiosperms
- Clade: Eudicots
- Clade: Asterids
- Order: Asterales
- Family: Asteraceae
- Genus: Ozothamnus
- Species: O. secundiflorus

Binomial name
- Ozothamnus secundiflorus (N.A.Wakef.) C.Jeffrey

Synonyms
- Helichrysum secundiflorum N.A.Wakef.

= Ozothamnus secundiflorus =

Species of shrub

Ozothamnus secundiflorus, the cascade everlasting, is an aromatic shrub species, endemic to Australia. It grows to between 0.5 and 2 metres in height. Leaves are 6 to 10 mm long and 1.5 to 4 mm wide. These are dark green with grey hairs on the upper surface, and white tomentose below. The white flower heads appear in dense clusters along one side of the stem between December and February in the species' native range.

The species was first formally described as Helichrysum secundiflorum by N.A. Wakefield in The Victorian Naturalist in 1951, based on plant material collected from Mount Cobberas by botanist Ferdinand von Mueller in 1854. The species was transferred to the genus Ozothamnus by C.Jefferey in 1976 in Trees & Shrubs Hardy in the British Isles

It occurs in open woodland in subalpine and sheltered alpine areas of New South Wales and Victoria. It is commonly seen amongst rocks in association with Eucalyptus pauciflora.
