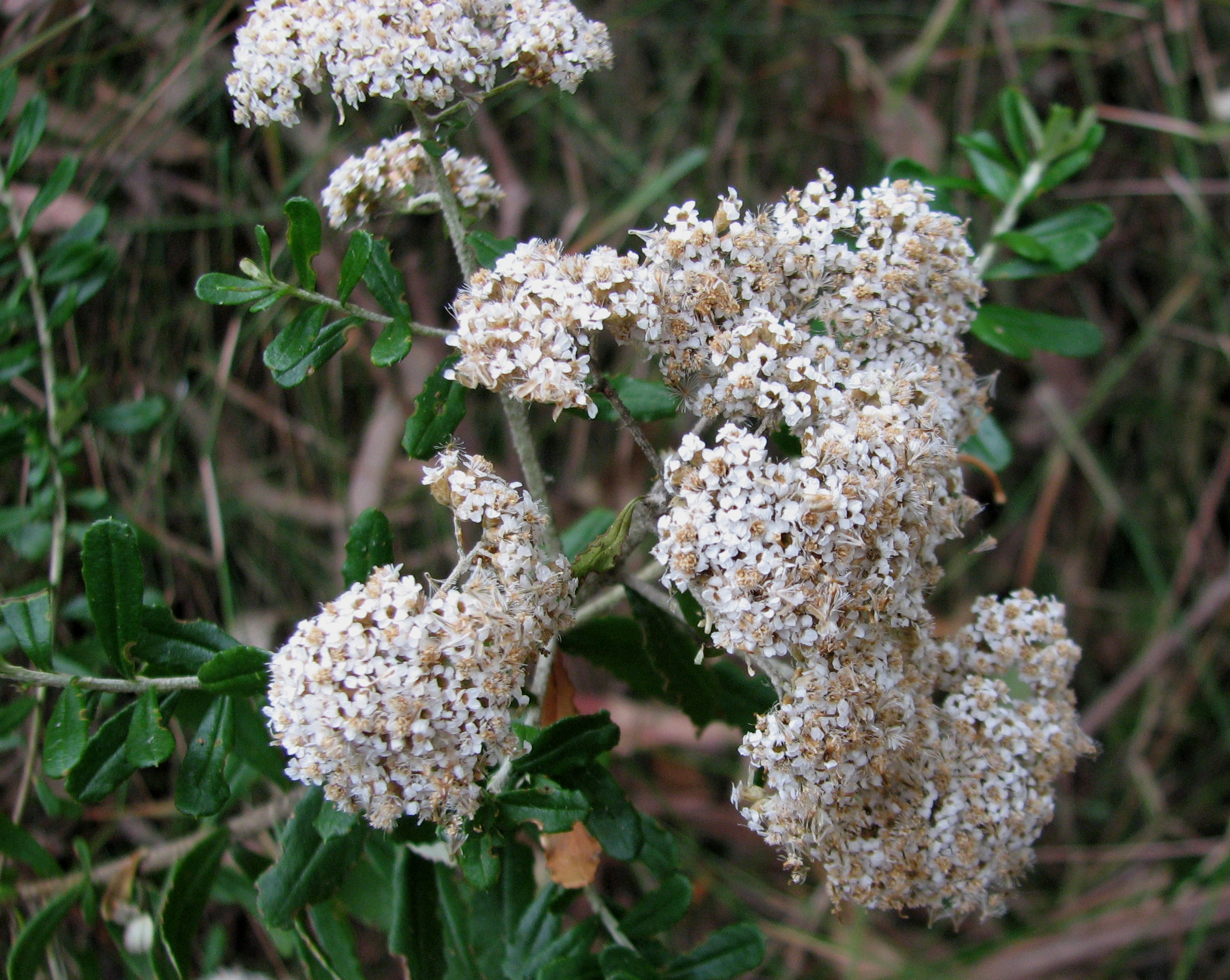
- Ozothamnus cuneifolius at Walhalla, Victoria

Scientific classification
- Kingdom: Plantae
- Clade: Tracheophytes
- Clade: Angiosperms
- Clade: Eudicots
- Clade: Asterids
- Order: Asterales
- Family: Asteraceae
- Genus: Ozothamnus
- Species: O. cuneifolius

Binomial name
- Ozothamnus cuneifolius (F.Muell. ex Benth.) Anderb.

Synonyms
- Helichrysum cuneifolium F.Muell. ex Benth.

= Ozothamnus cuneifolius =

Species of shrub

Ozothamnus cuneifolius, commonly known as wedge-leaf everlasting or wedge everlasting, is a shrub in the family Asteraceae. It is native to forests of the south-east of New South Wales and Gippsland in Victoria in Australia.

It grows to 3 metres high and has cuneate or spathulate leaves that are 20 to 40 mm long and 7 to 10 mm wide. These have green upper surfaces, while underneath they are covered with fine white hairs. The white flowerheads appear from November to January in the species' native range.

The species was formally described in 1867 by Victorian Government Botanist Ferdinand von Mueller in Flora Australiensis based on plant material collected along the Snowy River, La Trobe River and the tributaries of the Genoa River in Victoria. Mueller gave it the name Helichrysum cuneifolium. In 1991 the species was transferred to the genus Ozothamnus.
