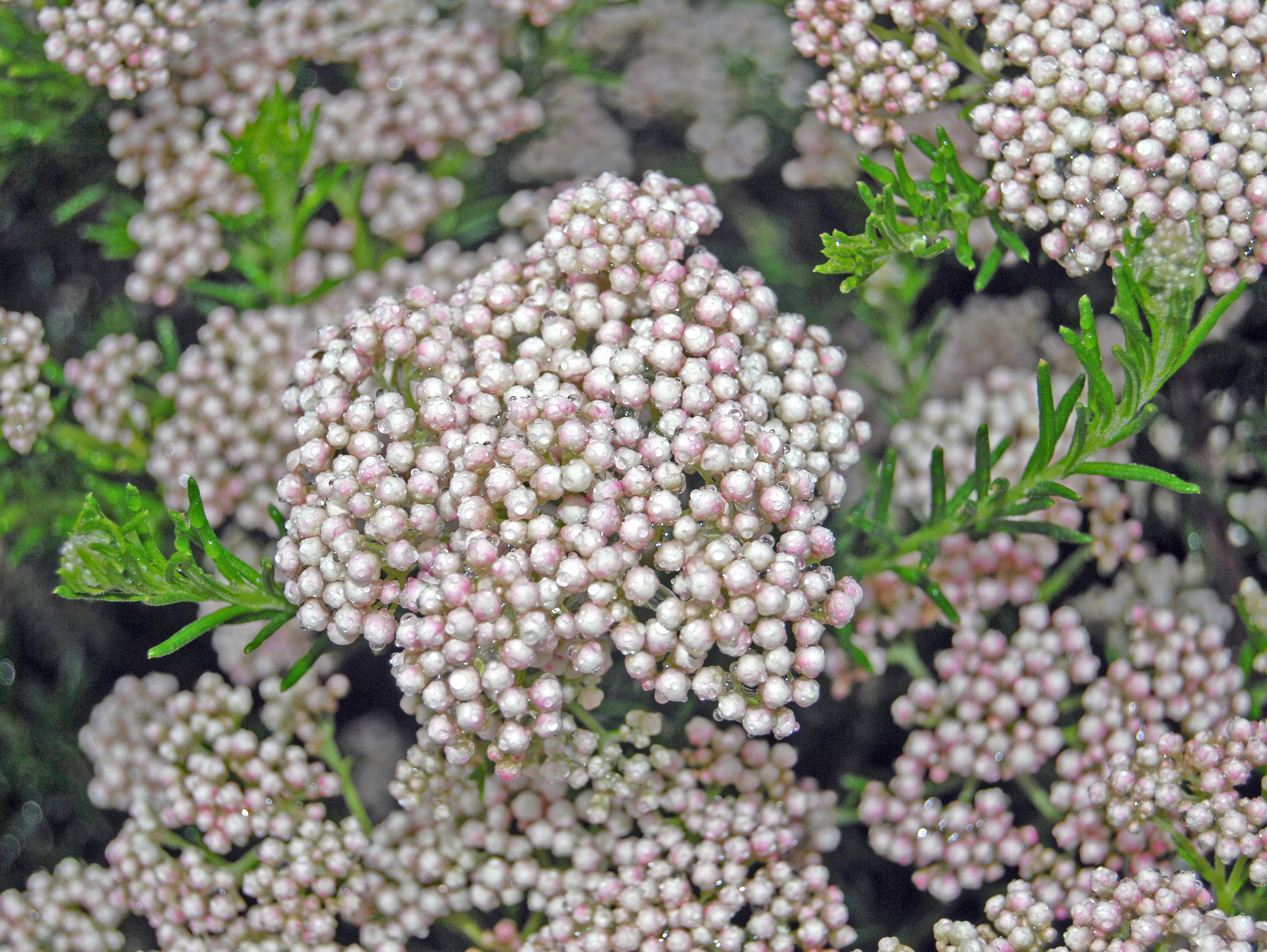
- Flowers of Ozothamnus rosmarinifolius

Scientific classification
- Kingdom: Plantae
- Clade: Tracheophytes
- Clade: Angiosperms
- Clade: Eudicots
- Clade: Asterids
- Order: Asterales
- Family: Asteraceae
- Genus: Ozothamnus
- Species: O. rosmarinifolius

Binomial name
- Ozothamnus rosmarinifolius (Labill.) Sweet

Synonyms
- Chrysocoma rosmarinifolia (Labill.) Spreng.; Eupatorium rosmarinifolium Labill.; Helichrysum rosmarinifolium (Labill.) Less. ex Benth.

= Ozothamnus rosmarinifolius =

Species of flowering plant

Ozothamnus rosmarinifolius, common name rosemary everlasting, is a species of plant in the family Asteraceae.

== Etymology ==
The species name rosmarinifolius means with leaves like rosemary. The genus name derives from the Greek, ozos (meaning branch) and thamnos (meaning shrub).

== Description ==
Ozothamnus rosmarinifolius can reach a height of about 1.5 metres (4 ft 11 in). It is an upright evergreen shrub. Leaves are narrow, silvery-grey. These plants form quite compact slightly rounded terminal clusters of pink buds. The white flowers are tiny and scented. Bracts range from yellowish to reddish. Flowering time lasts from November to February.

== Bibliography ==
- Walter Erhardt, Erich Götz, Nils Bödeker, Siegmund Seybold: Der große Zander. Eugen Ulmer KG, Stuttgart 2008, ISBN 978-3-8001-5406-7. (Ger.)
- Christopher Brickell (Editor-in-chief): RHS A-Z Encyclopedia of Garden Plants. Third edition. Dorling Kindersley, London 2003, ISBN 0-7513-3738-2.
