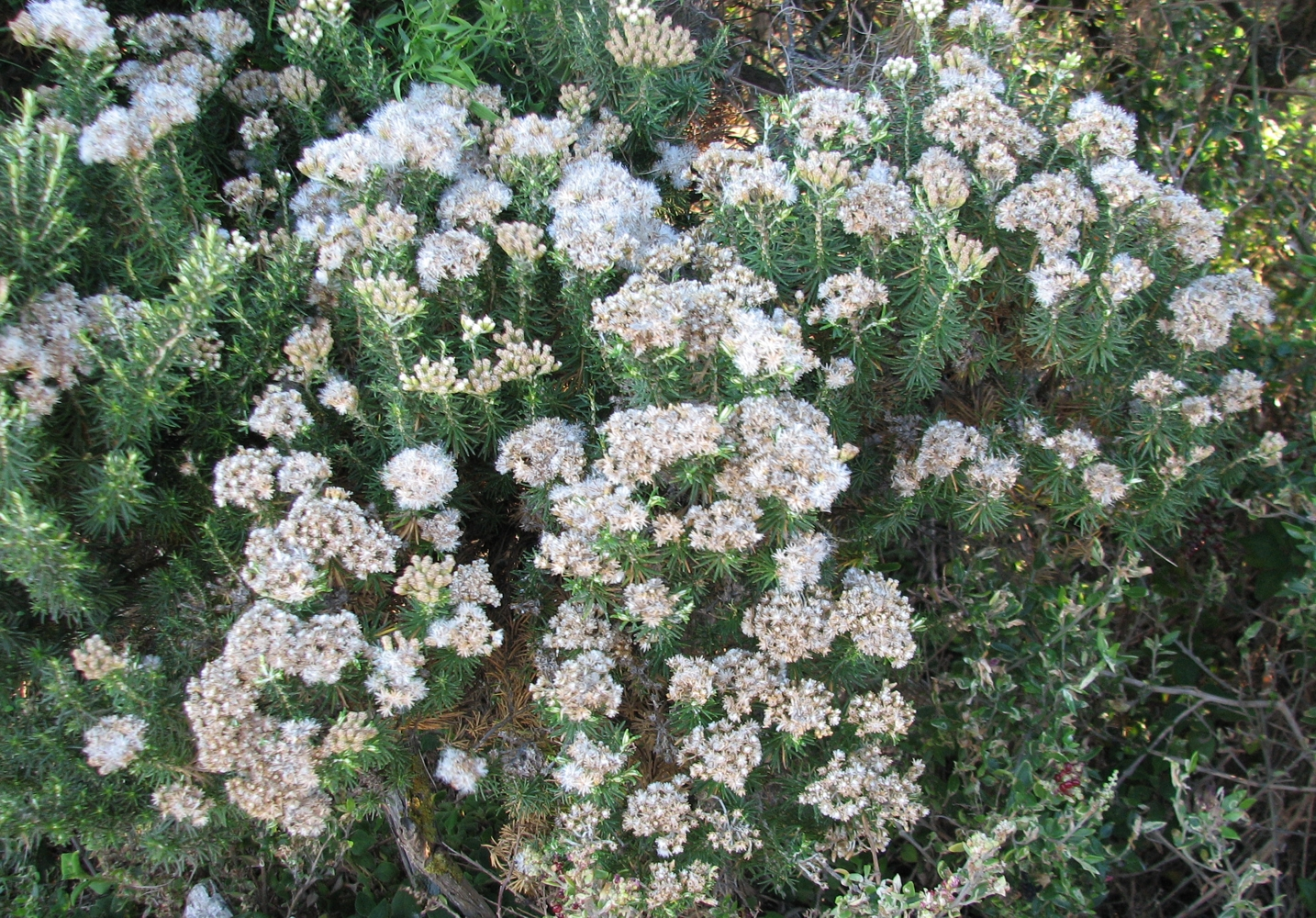
- Ozothamnus turbinatus, Cape Woolamai, Victoria

Scientific classification
- Kingdom: Plantae
- Clade: Tracheophytes
- Clade: Angiosperms
- Clade: Eudicots
- Clade: Asterids
- Order: Asterales
- Family: Asteraceae
- Genus: Ozothamnus
- Species: O. turbinatus

Binomial name
- Ozothamnus turbinatus DC.

Synonyms
- Helichrysum paralium (N.T.Burb.) W.M.Curtis; Helichrysum gunnii subsp. paralium N.T.Burb.

= Ozothamnus turbinatus =

Species of shrub

Ozothamnus turbinatus, the coast everlasting, is a shrub in the family Asteraceae, native to the states of New South Wales, Victoria, South Australia and Tasmania in Australia. It grows to between 1 and 2 metres in height.
