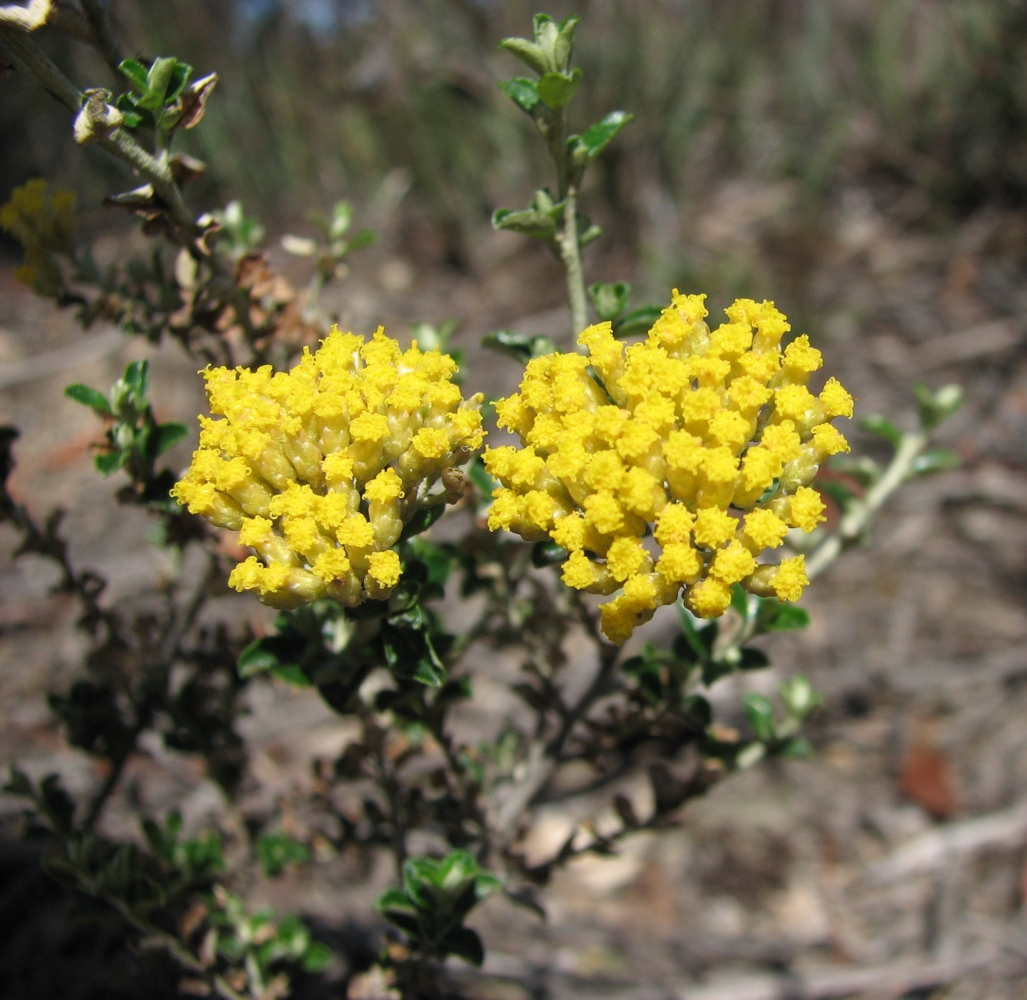
- Ozothamnus obcordatus, Brisbane Ranges National Park, Victoria

Scientific classification
- Kingdom: Plantae
- Clade: Tracheophytes
- Clade: Angiosperms
- Clade: Eudicots
- Clade: Asterids
- Order: Asterales
- Family: Asteraceae
- Genus: Ozothamnus
- Species: O. obcordatus

Binomial name
- Ozothamnus obcordatus DC.

Synonyms
- Helichrysum obcordatum (DC.) Benth. Cassinia obovata A.Cunn. ex DC.

= Ozothamnus obcordatus =

Species of shrub

Ozothamnus obcordatus, the grey everlasting, is a shrub in the family Asteraceae, native to the states of Queensland, New South Wales, Victoria and Tasmania in Australia.

It grows to 1.5 metres high and has obcordate, broad-elliptic obovate leaves which are 6 to 15 mm long and 3 to 6 mm wide. These have tips that bend backwards and are shiny and green on the top and covered with grey hairs underneath.

The species is regarded as having potential in commercial cut flower production.
