= Ozothamnus tesselatus =

Scientific classification
- Kingdom: Plantae
- Clade: Tracheophytes
- Clade: Angiosperms
- Clade: Eudicots
- Clade: Asterids
- Order: Asterales
- Family: Asteraceae
- Genus: Ozothamnus
- Species: O. tesselatus

Binomial name
- Ozothamnus tesselatus (Maiden & R.T.Baker) Anderb.

Species of shrub

Ozothamnus tesselatus, commonly known as tesselate everlasting, is a flowering plant in the family Asteraceae. It is a small shrub with woolly branches and globular heads of whitish to straw-coloured flowers.

== Description ==
Ozothamnus tesselatus is a small, upright shrub to 1 mm (0.039 in) high with stems densely covered in short, matted hairs. The leaves are oblong to narrow-linear, stiff, 4–5 mm (0.16–0.20 in) long, less than 1 mm (0.039 in) wide, apex curved backward, base decurrent along the stem 4–5 mm (0.16–0.20 in), margins rolled under. The leaf upper surface is green, sticky, shiny, rarely roughly textured, dotted with glands and the lower surface light coloured and woolly. The flower heads are borne at the end of branches in dense, globular corymbs 10.8–13.5 mm (0.43–0.53 in) wide, individual flowers about 4 mm (0.16 in) long and about 4.5 mm (0.18 in) in diameter, bracts egg-shaped, golden and translucent. Flowering occurs in spring and the fruit is a hairy achene.

== Taxonomy and naming ==
This ozothamnus was described in 1896 by Joseph Maiden and Richard Thomas Baker and given the name Helichrysum tesselatum. In 1991 Arne A. Anderberg changed the name to Ozothamnus tesselatus and the description was published in Opera Botanica.

== Distribution and habitat ==
Tesselate everlasting has a restricted distribution, growing in woodland north of Rylstone.
