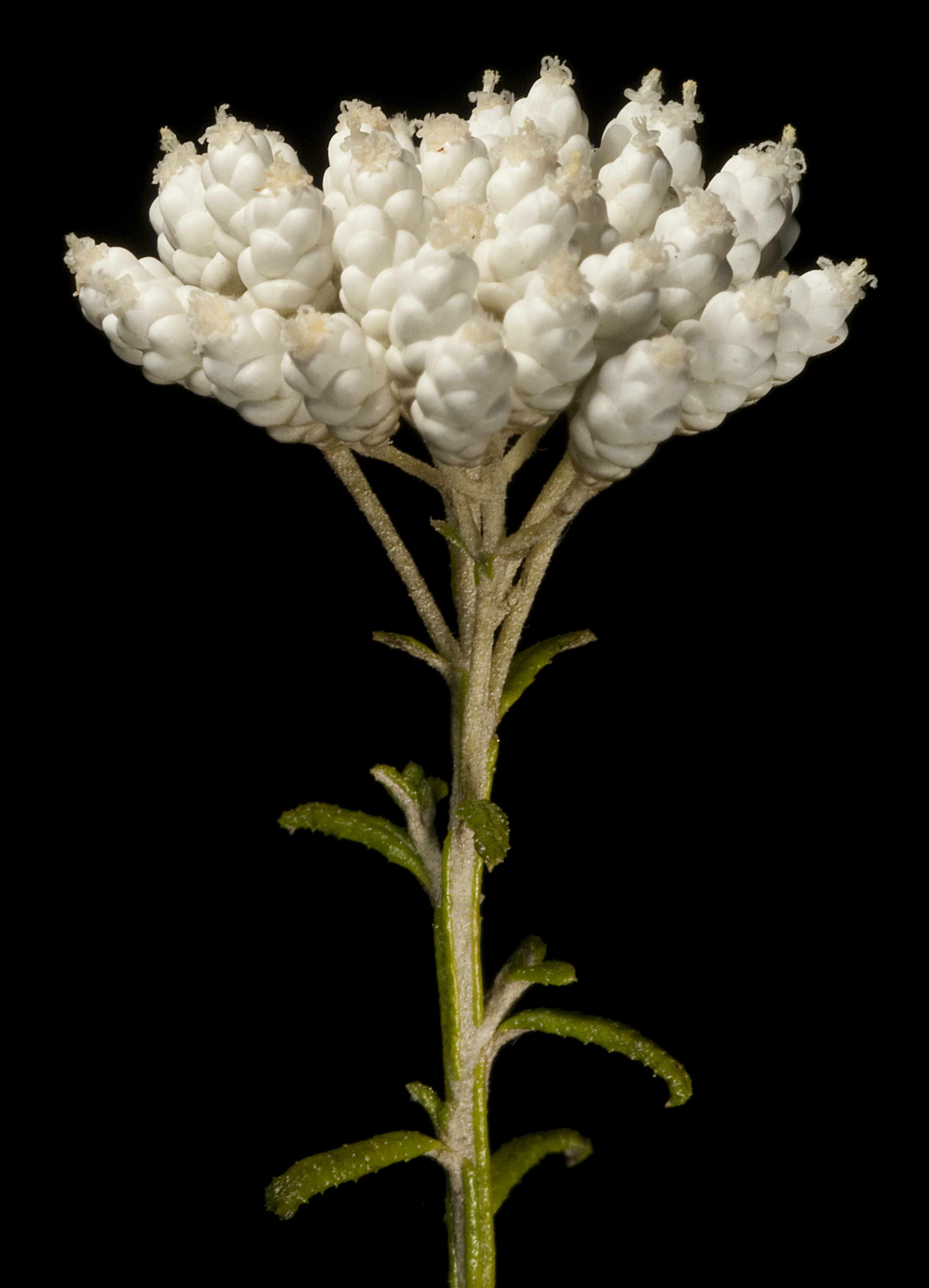

Scientific classification
- Kingdom: Plantae
- Clade: Embryophytes
- Clade: Tracheophytes
- Clade: Spermatophytes
- Clade: Angiosperms
- Clade: Eudicots
- Clade: Asterids
- Order: Asterales
- Family: Asteraceae
- Genus: Ozothamnus
- Species: O. occidentalis

Binomial name
- Ozothamnus occidentalis (N.T.Burb.) Anderb.

= Ozothamnus occidentalis =

Species of plant

Ozothamnus occidentalis (common name rough-leaved everlasting) is a shrub in the family Asteraceae (the daisy family), native to Western Australia.

The species was first described as Helichrysum occidentale in 1958 by Nancy Burbidge, and was transferred to the genus, Ozothamnus in 1991, by Arne Anderberg.
