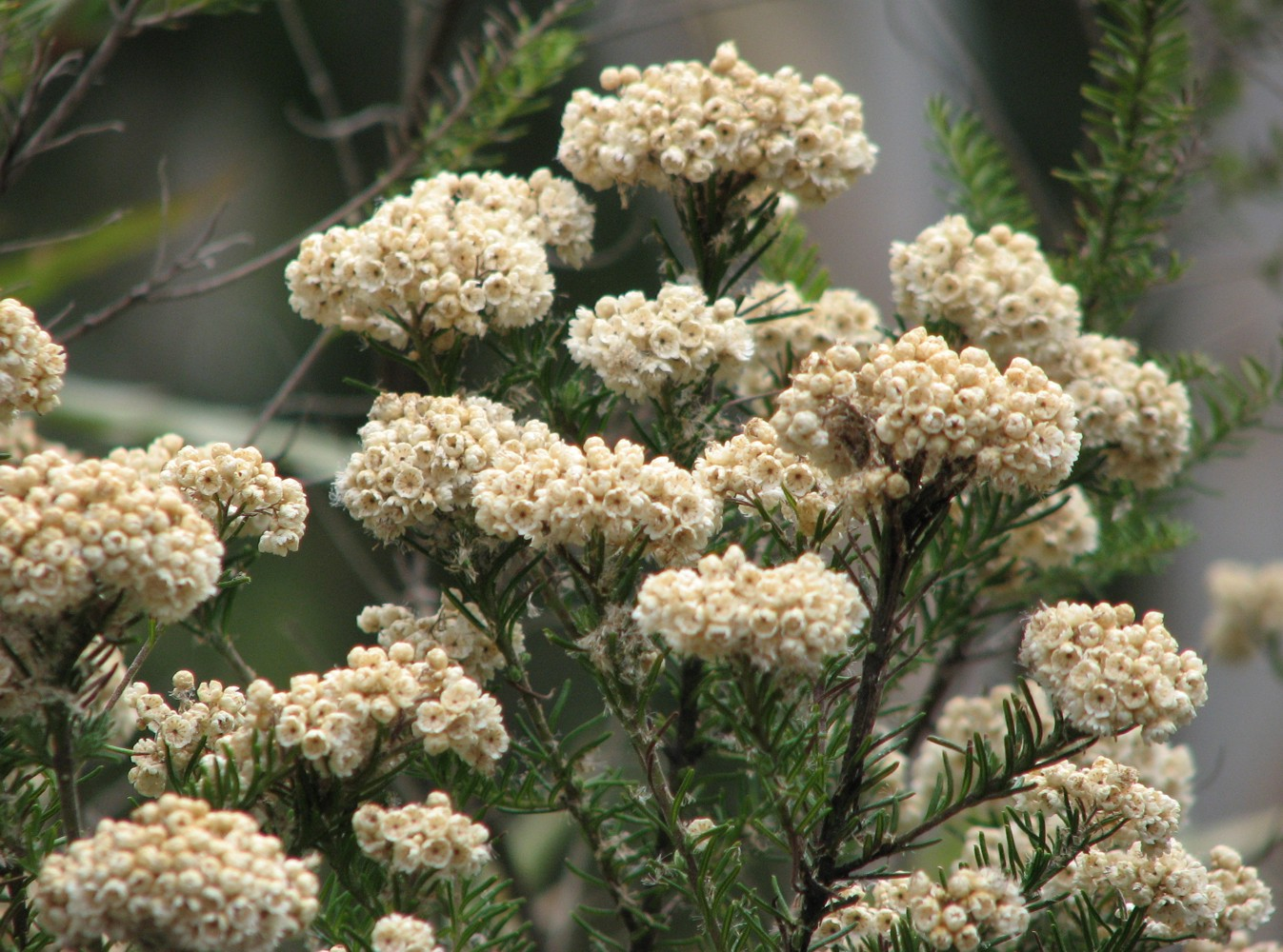
- Ozothamnus diosmifolius

Scientific classification
- Kingdom: Plantae
- Clade: Tracheophytes
- Clade: Angiosperms
- Clade: Eudicots
- Clade: Asterids
- Order: Asterales
- Family: Asteraceae
- Subfamily: Asteroideae
- Tribe: Gnaphalieae
- Genus: Ozothamnus; R.Br.

Species
- See text

= Ozothamnus =

Genus of flowering plants

Ozothamnus is a genus of plants found in Australia, New Zealand and New Caledonia.

The following is a list of species' names accepted by the Australian Plant Census as at January 2020:

- Ozothamnus adnatus - winged everlasting
- Ozothamnus alpinus - alpine everlasting
- Ozothamnus antennaria
- Ozothamnus argophyllus - spicy everlasting
- Ozothamnus bidwillii
- Ozothamnus blackallii ( N.T.Burb.) Anderb.
- Ozothamnus bracteolatus
- Ozothamnus cassinioides
- Ozothamnus cassiope (S.Moore) Anderb.
- Ozothamnus conditus
- Ozothamnus costatifructus
- Ozothamnus cuneifolius - wedge everlasting, wedge-leaf everlasting
- Ozothamnus cupressoides - scaly everlasting, kerosene bush
- Ozothamnus decurrens
- Ozothamnus diosmifolius (Vent.) DC. - rice flower, white dogwood, pill flower, sago bush
- Ozothamnus diotophyllus
- Ozothamnus ericifolius
- Ozothamnus eriocephalus
- Ozothamnus × expansifolius (P.Morris & J.H.Willis) Anderb.
- Ozothamnus ferrugineus (Labill.) Sweet - tree everlasting
- Ozothamnus hookeri - kerosene bush
- Ozothamnus kempei (F.Muell.) Anderb.
- Ozothamnus ledifolius (A.Cunn. ex DC.) Hook.f.
- Ozothamnus lepidophyllus Steetz.
- Ozothamnus leptophyllus - tauhinu, cottonwood (New Zealand)
- Ozothamnus lycopodioides
- Ozothamnus obcordatus - grey everlasting
- Ozothamnus obovatus
- Ozothamnus occidentalis (N.T.Burb.) Anderb.
- Ozothamnus pholidotus
- Ozothamnus purpurascens
- Ozothamnus reflexifolius
- Ozothamnus reticulatus
- Ozothamnus retusus
- Ozothamnus rodwayi
  - Ozothamnus rodwayi subsp. kingii
  - Ozothamnus rodwayi var. oreophilus
  - Ozothamnus rodwayi var. rodwayi
- Ozothamnus rogersianus (J.H.Willis) Anderb.
- Ozothamnus rosmarinifolius
- Ozothamnus rufescens
- Ozothamnus scaber
- Ozothamnus scutellifolius
- Ozothamnus secundiflorus - cascade everlasting
- Ozothamnus selaginoides
- Ozothamnus stirlingii - Ovens everlasting
- Ozothamnus tesselatus
- Ozothamnus thyrsoideus
- Ozothamnus tuckeri
- Ozothamnus turbinatus - coast everlasting
- Ozothamnus vagans
- Ozothamnus vauvilliersii - mountain cottonwood (New Zealand)
- Ozothamnus whitei
