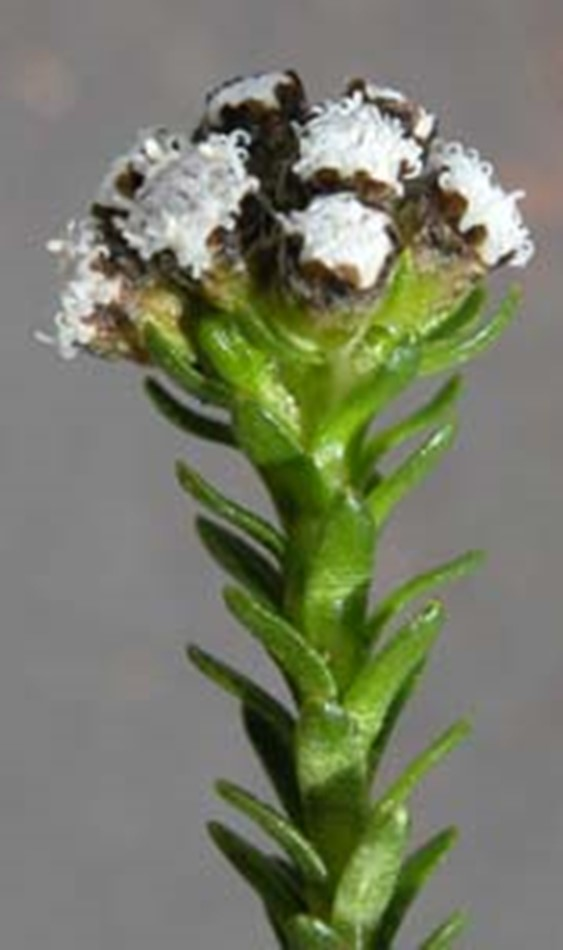

Scientific classification
- Kingdom: Plantae
- Clade: Tracheophytes
- Clade: Angiosperms
- Clade: Eudicots
- Clade: Asterids
- Order: Asterales
- Family: Asteraceae
- Genus: Ozothamnus
- Species: O. lycopodioides

Binomial name
- Ozothamnus lycopodioides Hook.f.

Synonyms
- Helichrysum lycopodioides (Hook.f.) Benth.

= Ozothamnus lycopodioides =

Clubmoss everlastingbush

Species of plant

Ozothamnus lycopodioides, commonly known as clubmoss everlastingbush, is a plant species endemic to Tasmania. The specific epithet "lycopodioides" refers to the resemblance of the foliage to that of plants (clubmosses) in the Lycopodium genus (-oides is a Greek suffix meaning 'resembling').

== Taxonomy ==
Originally described by Joseph Dalton Hooker in 1847 as Helichrysum lycopodioides, it was later reclassified as Ozothamnus lycopodioides. The species belongs to the Asteraceae family, specifically the tribe Gnaphalieae.

== Description ==
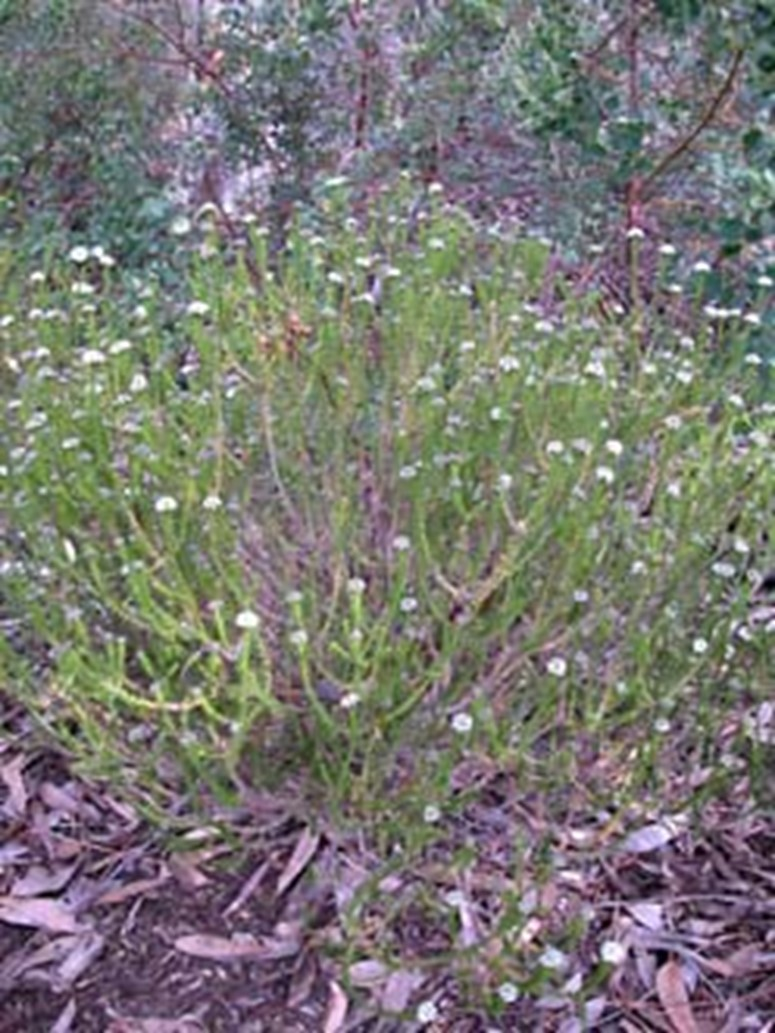
Spreading habit of O.lycopodioides

O. lycopodioides is a slender, much-branched, spreading shrub typically reaching heights of 50-100 cm. The leaves are leathery, stalkless, and overlapping, with a narrow, rounded shape and a blunt tip. They are often sticky with oily hairs. Flowering occurs in spring, with rounded terminal clusters of compact, white daisies about 0.5 cm across. Thin, dry, sticky, brown bracts surround the flowers. The fruit is small and dry, with leathery walls and wind-dispersed seeds.

== Habitat & distribution ==
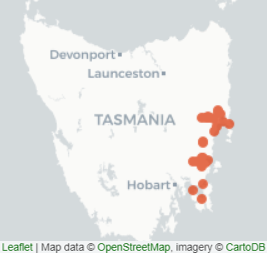
Distribution map of Ozothamnus lycopodioides

Ozothamnus lycopodioides is found in dry sclerophyll forest near the east coast of Tasmania, typically growing on rocky slopes along rivers. Key sites where populations of the species can be found include Paradise Gorge along the Tasman Highway, the Sugarloaf, Prosser River, Lake Leake Road, Kelvedon, Swansea, Swanston Road, north of Buckland Military Training Area, Little Swanport, Griffiths Rivulet and near the Thumbs picnic area. It is reserved in the Apslawn Forest Reserve, Cygnet River Forest Reserve, Dry Creek East Nature Reserve, Eastern Tiers Forest Reserve, Lost Falls Forest Reserve, Swan River Forest Reserve, Three Thumbs State Reserve and Wye River State Reserve.

== Distinguishing traits ==
Aside from its location, Ozothamnus lycopodioides can be distinguished by its slender, much-branched form and distinctive foliage. The tips of its inner bracts are cupped and dark brown/purple.

== Conservation/threats ==
Ozothamnus lycopodioides is considered rare, and is not listed under Commonwealth status. It faces threats from habitat degradation and alteration, particularly from fires. Ziegler (2003) recommended that shrubby sites where O. lycopodioides grows should not be burnt at intervals of fewer than 30 years, due to slow regeneration times of the flora. The largest seedlings at the Thumbs lookout reached a height of only 20 cm and began flowering 11 years after a 1994 fire.

This species is unpalatable to livestock.

== Cultivation/uses ==
This dwarf evergreen shrub with spreading branches is suitable for native gardens, thriving in most soils with good drainage and tolerating full sun to part shade. It responds well to pruning for shape and is attractive to butterflies.
