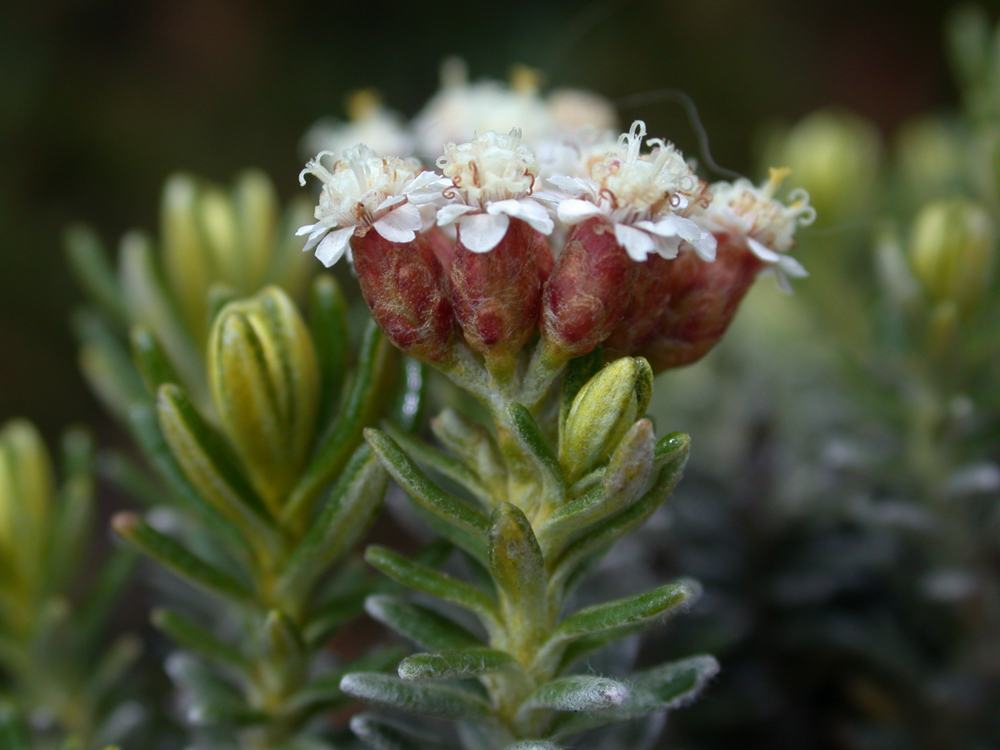
- Ozothamnus ledifolius by Robert Wiltshire (UTAS), TAS

Scientific classification
- Kingdom: Plantae
- Clade: Tracheophytes
- Clade: Angiosperms
- Clade: Eudicots
- Clade: Asterids
- Order: Asterales
- Family: Asteraceae
- Genus: Ozothamnus
- Species: O. ledifolius

Binomial name
- Ozothamnus ledifolius (A.Cunn. ex. DC.) Hook.f.

= Ozothamnus ledifolius =

Species of shrub

Ozothamnus ledifolius is a shrub, from the family Asteraceae and one of 54 species from the genus Ozothamnus. Harold Frederick Comber (1897–1969), an English horticulturist and plant collector, introduced Ozothamnus ledifolius in 1929 on mountains of Tasmania above 2500 ft. high from the seeds collected from 4000 ft. height.

== Etymology ==
The famous Scottish botanist Robert Brown (1773–1858) [author abbreviation is R.Br.] erected the genus Ozothamnus in taxonomical classification. Ozothamnus ledifolius species was first described by Augustin Pyramus de Candolle (1778–1841) [author abbreviation is DC.]. Joseph Dalton Hooker (1817–1911) [author abbreviation is Hook. f.] reclassified Ozothamnus ledifolius in modern botanical classification system. The other synonym of Ozothamnus ledifolius is Cassinia ledifolia, which was coined by Allan Cunningham (1791–1839) [author abbreviation is A. Cunn.] and Helichrysum ledifolium, which was coined by George Bentham (1800–1884) [author abbreviation is Benth.].

Ozothamnus ledifolius is commonly known as Kerosene Bush, because of its aromatic scent drifted during warm weather and highly flammable nature. It is also known as mountain everlasting bush and mountain spice in different mountains of Tasmania.

== Taxonomy ==
All the species of genus Ozothamnus are shrubs and among 54 species 44 species are restricted to Australia. Ozothamnus is from daisy family (asteraceae), which ranks under eudicots. Thus Ozothamnus ledifolius shows special types of flower inflorescence and have true dicotyledons. Gnaphalieae (tribe) is the hypernym of Ozothamnus, which is commonly known as pussy's-toes tribe.

== Description ==
=== Growth ===
Ozothamnus ledifolius species are slow growing woody shrubs, between 1-2m height. It is found as dense rounded shrubs and erect stems are observed, which are yellowish-green in colour. The juvenile stems are downy. These shrubs have draught and heavy frost resistance. The species propagates from seeds to semi-ripe and ripe-wood cuttings (cud-weed).

=== Leaves ===
The lanceolate leaves of Ozothamnus ledifolius are evergreen, neat and glossy above and downy underneath, with a revolute margin, and produce a peppery fragrance in summer due to the leaf exudates that include a series of flavonoid aglycones and mostly consist of mixture of terpenoids. In resinous material of leaf exudate four sesquiterpenes, a diterpenediol and two pentacyclic triterpene acids are present. The phenolic portion of exudate encompasses three phenylethyl esters.

=== Flowers ===
The flowers of Ozothamnus ledifolius are white and small. Orange buds open to white flower heads in late spring. The flowers are clustered with longer stalks and formed a convex flower head (corymbs). They are arranged in a radiating pattern (many stellate). The fragrance of the flowers attracts bees, birds and butterflies.

=== Fruits ===
Ozothamnus ledifolius produce one seeded fruit that does not open to release seed (achene). The maximum observed seed dormancy is two months. Seeds take two to four weeks to germinate.

== Distribution ==
Ozothamnus ledifolius is an endemic species of Tasmania and forms alpine cushion in alpine heath vegetation. It is also found in rock gardens. Ozothamnus ledifolius occurs near the summit-viewing region of Mt. Wellington in Hobart. It is known as mountain everlasting bush in Derwent Valley, at Mt. Field National Park (Lake Belcher track).

Occurrence and distribution of Ozothamnus ledifolius

Place	Latitude	Longitude	Data Provider
Huon Valley, South Port	−43.417	146.967	Australia's Virtual Herbarium
Tasman	−43.179	147.831	Tasmanian Natural Values Atlas
Hobart, Mt. Wellington	−42.882	147.233	New Zealand Virtual Herbarium
Derwent Valley, Mt. Field National Park (Lake Belcher track)	−42.667	146.55	Tasmanian Natural Values Atlas
Central Highlands, Millers Bluff, Great Western Tiers	−41.95	147.17	Australia's Virtual Herbarium
Northern Midlands	−41.839	146.975	Tasmanian Natural Values Atlas
Meander Valley	−41.729	146.671	Tasmanian Natural Values Atlas
Kentish, Crater Lake, on E side along track rising to Marions Lookout.	−41.667	145.93	Australia's Virtual Herbarium
Break O'Day	−41.349	147.870	Tasmanian Natural Values Atlas

== Cultivation ==
Ozothamnus ledifolius has a large capacity for photosynthetic light consumption, thus its need for low light indulgence. Thus it needs a sunny sheltered place where sun is not overhead. For growth, it needs acidic, sandy, constantly moist and well-drained soil. Other perennial weeds may hinder the growth of Ozothamnus ledifolius. It is also phosphorus intolerant.

== Conservation ==
The conservation status of Ozothamnus ledifolius is very poor in Tasmania and constricted to Mt. Wellington Park.

== Uses ==
The daisy family is commonly used as ornamental plants. Ozothamnus ledifolius are used as Mediterranean designs in coastal beds, slopes and banks. It is also used as ornamental informal or formal edging and as borders. Trimming the stems promotes bushy growth.
