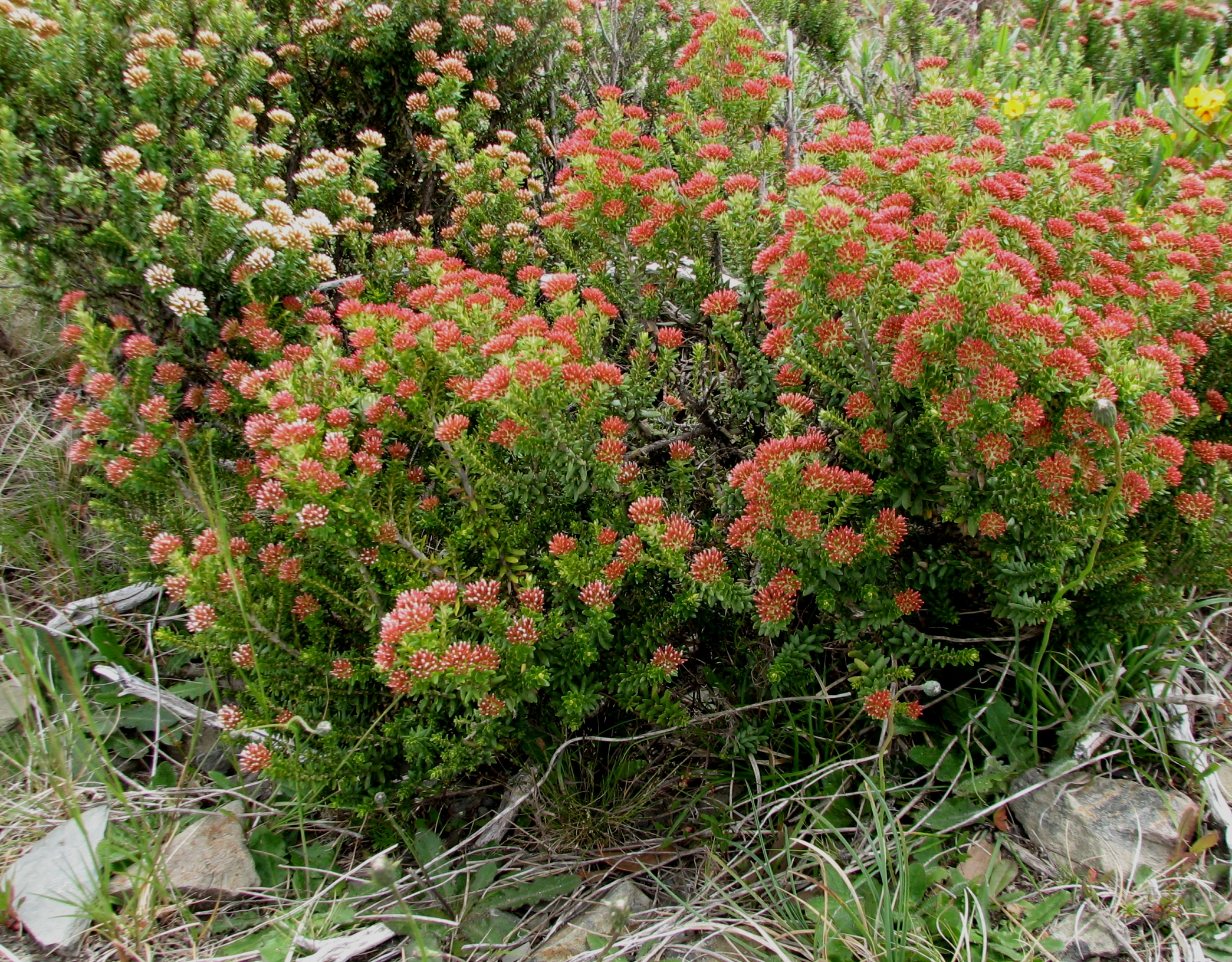
- Ozothamnus alpinus Mount Hotham, Victoria

Scientific classification
- Kingdom: Plantae
- Clade: Embryophytes
- Clade: Tracheophytes
- Clade: Angiosperms
- Clade: Eudicots
- Clade: Asterids
- Order: Asterales
- Family: Asteraceae
- Genus: Ozothamnus
- Species: O. alpinus

Binomial name
- Ozothamnus alpinus (N.A.Wakef.) Anderb.

Synonyms
- Helichrysum alpinum N.A.Wakef.

= Ozothamnus alpinus =

Species of shrub

Ozothamnus alpinus, commonly known as alpine everlasting, is a flowering plant in the family Asteraceae. It is endemic to alpine and subalpine areas in south-eastern continental Australia.

== Description ==
Ozothamnus alpinus usually grows to between 0.75–1 m (2 ft 6 in – 3 ft 3 in) high, branches densely covered in yellow, short, matted hairs, turning grey as they age. The leaves are spreading and crowded along the stem, oblong shaped, 4–10 mm (0.16–0.39 in) long and 2–3 mm (0.079–0.118 in) wide, margins flat or slightly curved under, apex rounded, and on a petiole 1–2 mm (0.039–0.079 in) long. The leaf upper surface is green and smooth, the lower surface yellowish with furry, long, stiff, shiny simple hairs. The inflorescence is a small dense head of 25-60 white to yellowish flowers in a cluster 18–24 mm (0.71–0.94 in) in diameter, individual flowers are 5–6.5 mm (0.20–0.26 in) long and 1.5–2 mm (0.059–0.079 in) wide. The 15-19 pink or red outer bracts stand out when the flowers are in bud. Flowering occurs from February to March and the fruit is a cylindric shaped cypsela 1–1.5 mm (0.039–0.059 in) long and tapering at the apex.

== Taxonomy and naming ==
This species was described in 1951 by Norman Wakefield based on a specimen collected in 1888 by Carl Walter at Mount Hotham and given the name Helichrysum alpinum. In 1991 Arne A. Anderberg gave it the name Ozothamnus alpinus and the description was published in Opera Botanica.

== Distribution and habitat ==
Alpine everlasting occurs from the Mount Kosciuszko area and southwards on the edge of wet alpine heath or in bogs.
