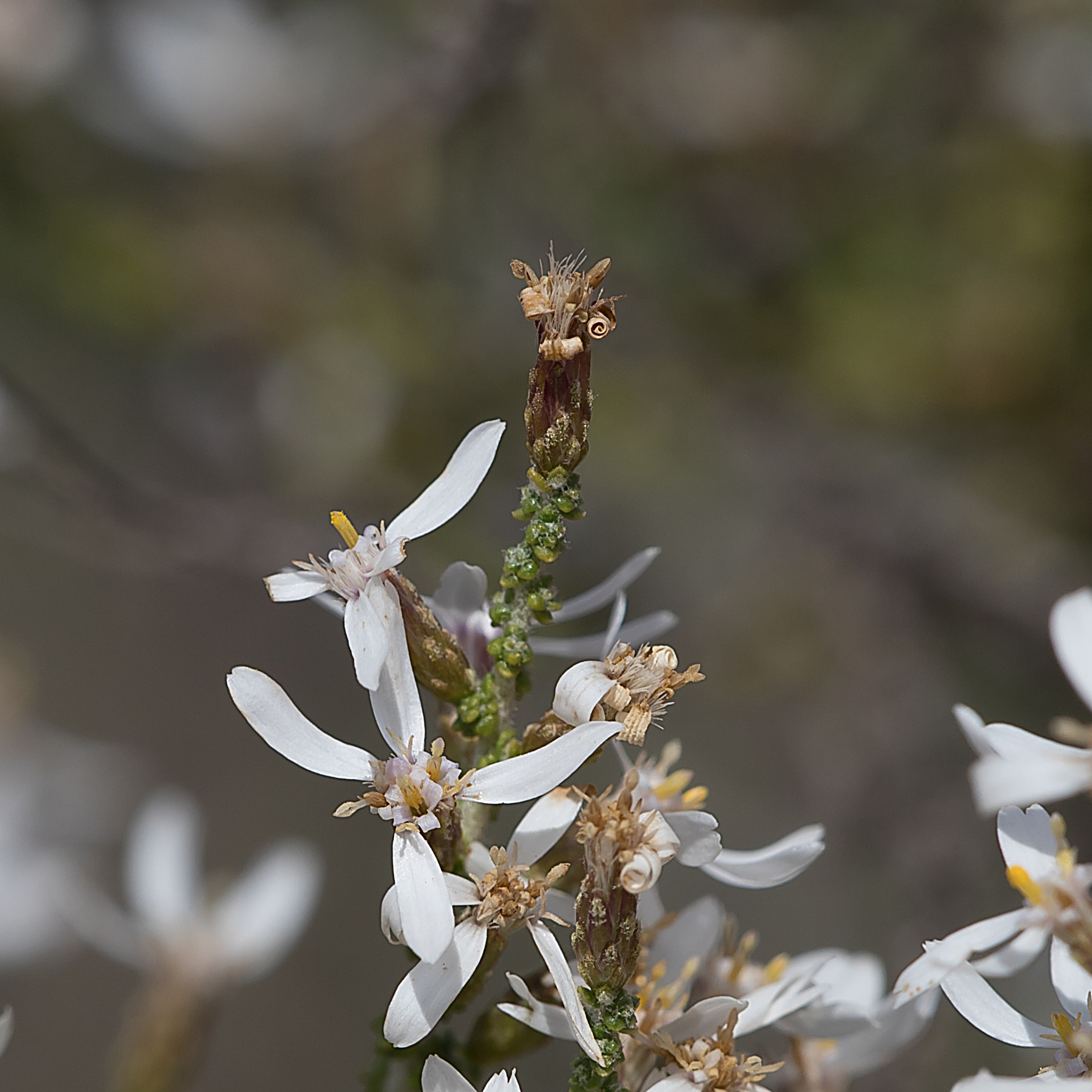
- Near Markaranka

Scientific classification
- Kingdom: Plantae
- Clade: Tracheophytes
- Clade: Angiosperms
- Clade: Eudicots
- Clade: Asterids
- Order: Asterales
- Family: Asteraceae
- Genus: Olearia
- Species: O. lepidophylla

Binomial name
- Olearia lepidophylla (Pers.) Benth.

Synonyms
- Aster lepidophyllus Pers.; Aster microphyllus Labill. nom. illeg.; Diplostephium lepidophyllum (Pers.) Nees; Eurybia lepidophylla (Pers.) DC.; Eurybia lepidophylla var. lawrencei Hook.f.; Eurybia lepidophylla var. lawrencii Hook.f. orth. var.; Eurybia lepidophylla (Pers.) DC. var. lepidophylla; Shawia lepidophylla (Pers.) Sch.Bip.

= Olearia lepidophylla =

Species of flowering plant

Olearia lepidophylla, commonly known as club-moss daisy-bush, is a species of flowering plant in the family Asteraceae and is endemic to southern Australia. It is a rigid, erect to spreading shrub with tiny oblong to egg-shaped leaves and white and yellow, daisy-like inflorescences.

== Description ==
Olearia lepidophylla is a rigid, erect to spreading shrub that typically grows to a height of up to 1.5 m (4 ft 11 in) and has twiggy branchlets covered with woolly white hairs. Its leaves are arranged alternately along the branchlets and clustered, oblong to egg-shaped, 0.5–1.5 mm (0.020–0.059 in) long, 0.3–0.8 mm (0.012–0.031 in) wide and more or less sessile. The edges of the leaves are rolled under and the lower surface is covered with pale gey, woolly hairs. The heads or daisy-like "flowers" are arranged singly on the ends of branchlets and are 6–15 mm (0.24–0.59 in) in diameter and sessile. Each head has four to seven white ray florets, the ligule 3–5 mm (0.12–0.20 in) long, surrounding four to six yellow disc florets. Flowering occurs from March to June and the fruit is a silky-hairy achene, the pappus with 29 to 44 bristles.

== Taxonomy ==
This olearia was first formally described in 1807 by Christiaan Hendrik Persoon who gave it the name Aster lepidophyllus in his Synopsis Plantarum. In 1867, George Bentham changed the name to Olearia lepidophylla in Flora Australiensis. The specific epithet (lepidophylla) means "scale-leaved".

== Distribution and habitat ==
Olearia lepidophylla grows in mallee and heath and on coastal sand dunes in the Esperance Plains, Hampton and Mallee bioregions of Western Australia, the south-east of South Australia, mainly in the far north-west of Victoria, the south-west of New South Wales and on the coast and a few inland areas of Tasmania.
