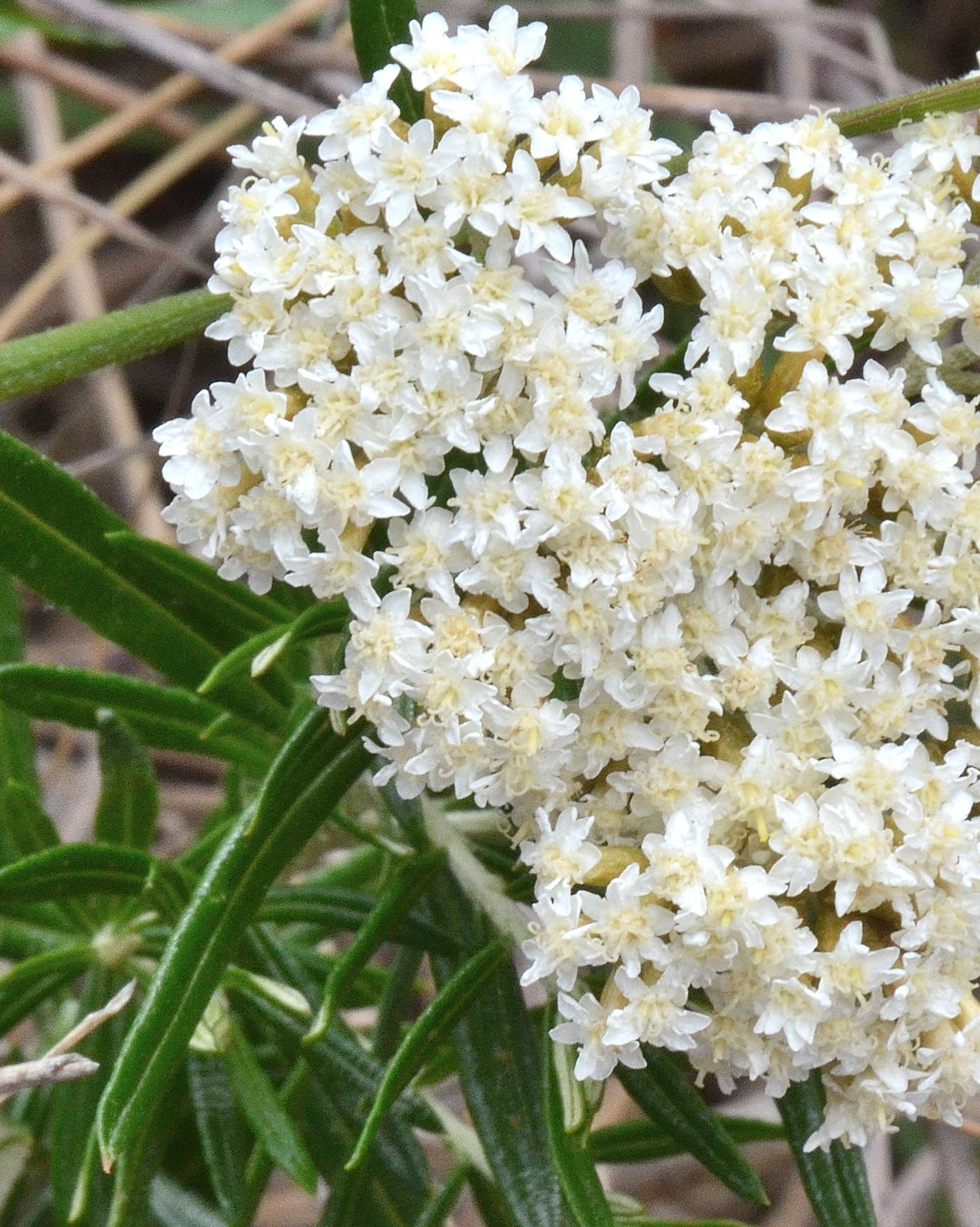

Scientific classification
- Kingdom: Plantae
- Clade: Tracheophytes
- Clade: Angiosperms
- Clade: Eudicots
- Clade: Asterids
- Order: Asterales
- Family: Asteraceae
- Genus: Ozothamnus
- Species: O. thyrsoideus

Binomial name
- Ozothamnus thyrsoideus DC.

Synonyms
- Helichrysum thyrsoideum (DC.) P.Morris & J.H.Willis; Helichrysum rosmarinifolium var. thyrsoideum (DC.) Maiden

= Ozothamnus thyrsoideus =

Sticky everlasting

Species of shrub

Ozothamnus thyrsoideus, commonly known as sticky everlasting, is a flowering shrub, endemic to south-eastern Australia. It grows to between 0.5 and 2 metres in height. Leaves are 15 to 30 mm long and 1.5 to 2 mm wide. Flowerheads appear in terminal corymbs in the summer.

The species was formally described in 1838 by Swiss botanist Augustin Pyramus de Candolle, based on plant material collected in Tasmania.

It occurs in subalpine areas of New South Wales, the Australian Capital Territory, Victoria and Tasmania.
