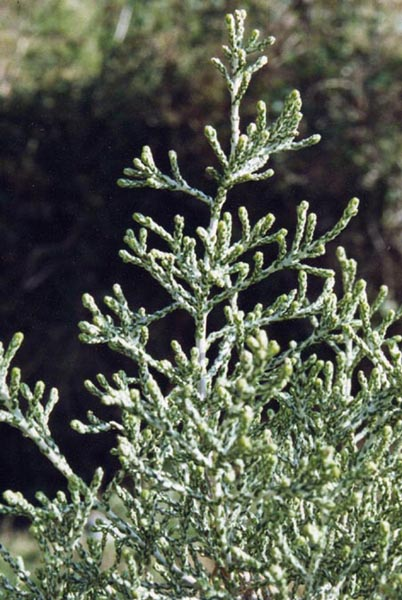

Scientific classification
- Kingdom: Plantae
- Clade: Tracheophytes
- Clade: Angiosperms
- Clade: Eudicots
- Clade: Asterids
- Order: Asterales
- Family: Asteraceae
- Genus: Ozothamnus
- Species: O. hookeri

Binomial name
- Ozothamnus hookeri Sond.

Synonyms
- Baccharis lepidophylla DC.; Helichrysum baccharoides F.Muell. nom. illeg.; Helichrysum baccharoides F.Muell. ex Benth. nom. illeg.; Helichrysum hookeri (Sond.) Druce var. hookeri; Helichrysum hookeri (Sond.) Druce; Helichrysum lepidophyllum (DC.) Tovey & P.Morris nom. illeg.; Helichrysum lepidophyllum (Steetz) F.Muell. ex Benth.; Ozothamnus lepidophyllus (DC.) Hook.f. nom. illeg.

= Ozothamnus hookeri =

Species of shrub

Ozothamnus hookeri, commonly known as kerosene bush, is an aromatic shrub species, endemic to Australia. It grows to between 0.5 and 1 metre in height and has white-tomentose branchlets. The scale-like leaves are 4 to 5 mm long and 0.5 to 1 mm wide. These are green on the upper surface, and white tomentose below. The flower heads appear in dense clusters in summer and autumn The species occurs in boggy sites and subalpine heathland New South Wales and Tasmania.

The species was formally described in 1853 by German botanist Otto Wilhelm Sonder. The Latin specific epithet hookeri refers to the English botanist William Jackson Hooker (1785-1865).
