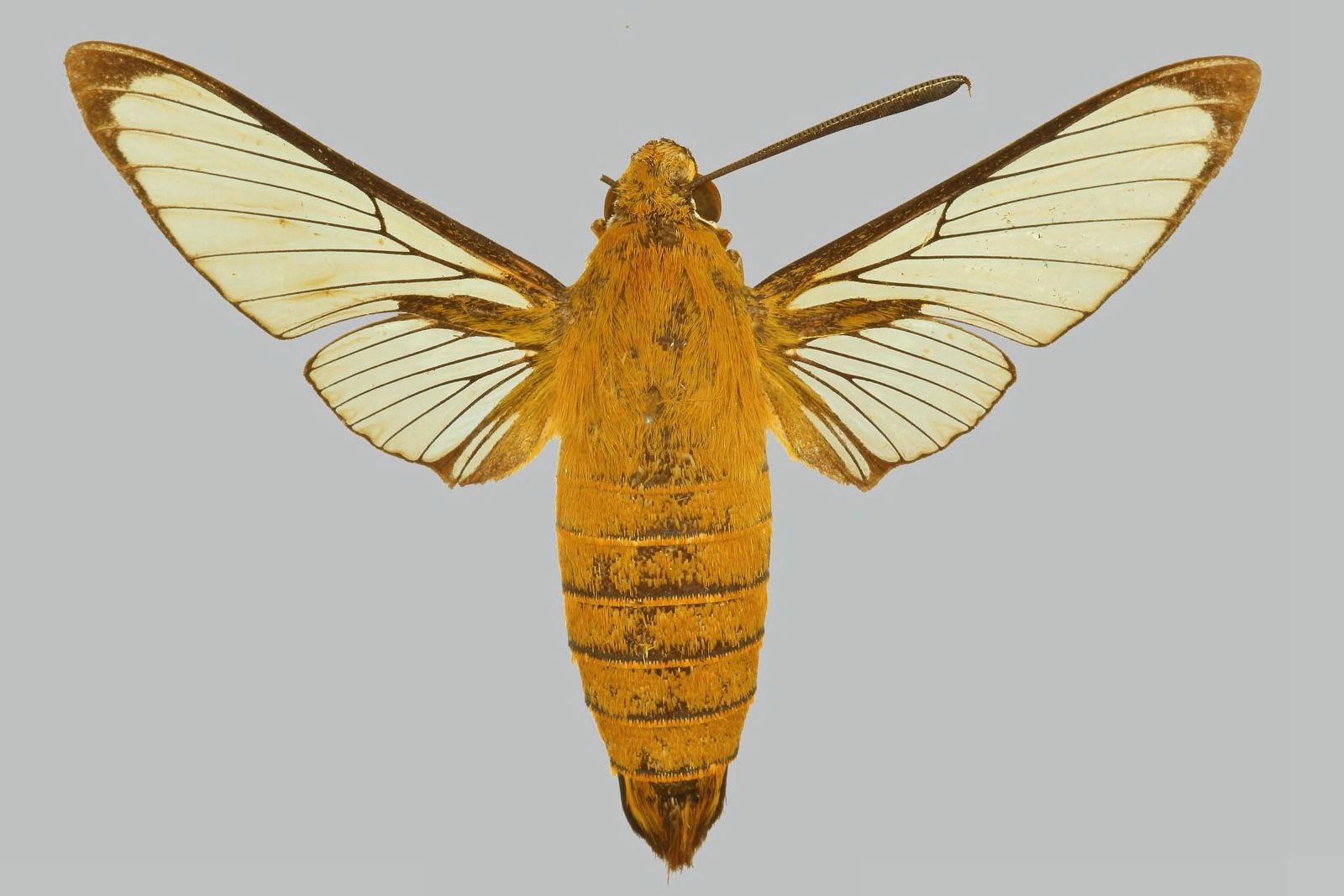
- Male

Scientific classification
- Domain: Eukaryota
- Kingdom: Animalia
- Phylum: Arthropoda
- Class: Insecta
- Order: Lepidoptera
- Family: Sphingidae
- Genus: Cephonodes
- Species: C. xanthus

Binomial name
- Cephonodes xanthus Rothschild & Jordan, 1903

= Cephonodes xanthus =

Species of moth

Cephonodes xanthus is a moth of the family Sphingidae. It is known from Japan (Shikoku, Kyushu, Tanegashima, Tokara Island and the Ryukyu Archipelago).

It resembles Cephonodes janus janus and Cephonodes trochilus in the unicolorous green upperside of the abdomen, and the latter especially in the somewhat deeper tint posteriorly. It is distinguishable from both by the broader forewing apical patch and the black abdominal tuft. The upperside of the abdomen is unicolorous green. The anal tuft is black and only the dorso-lateral scales are yellow. The underside of the head, thorax and abdomen are orange.
