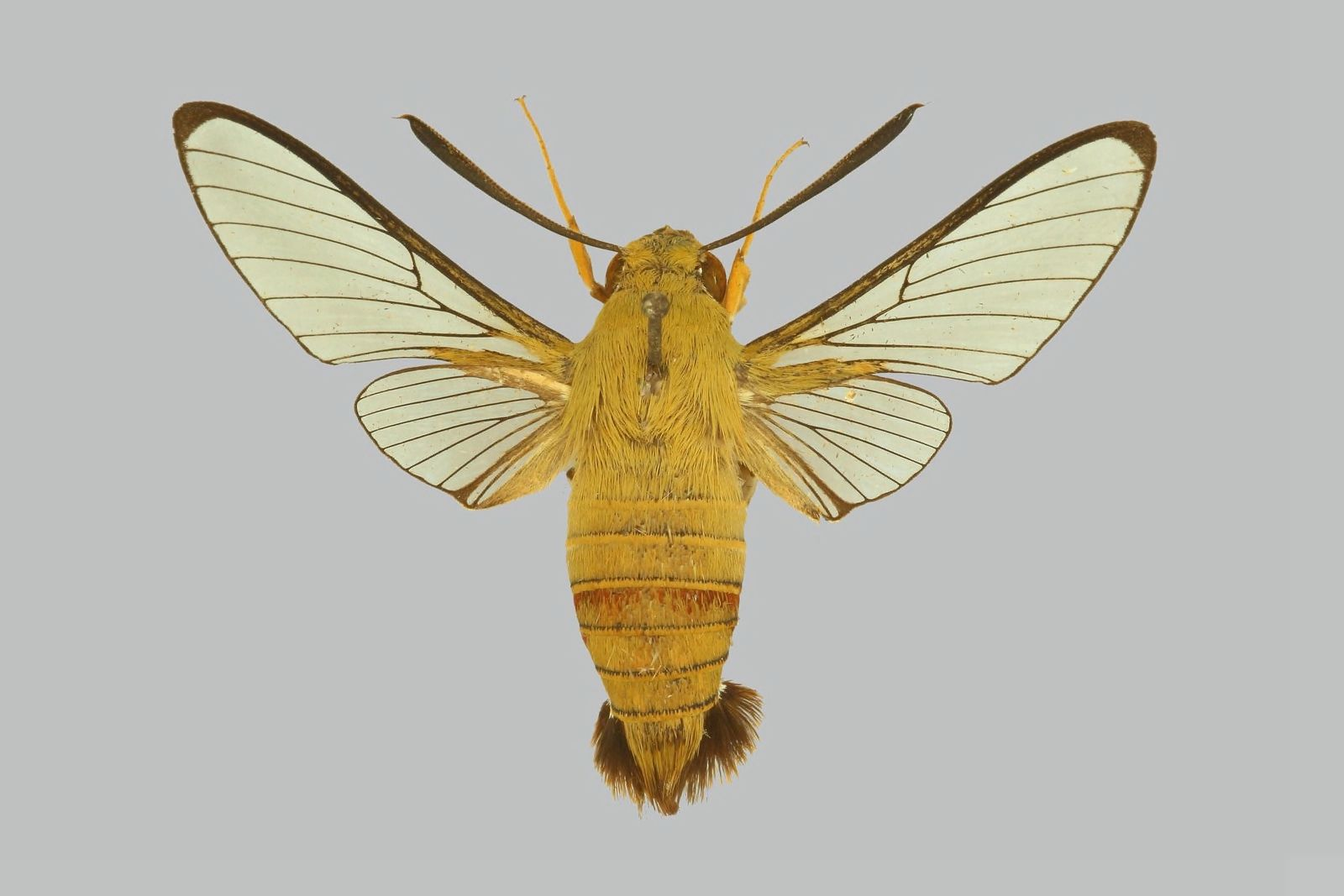
- Male

Scientific classification
- Domain: Eukaryota
- Kingdom: Animalia
- Phylum: Arthropoda
- Class: Insecta
- Order: Lepidoptera
- Family: Sphingidae
- Genus: Cephonodes
- Species: C. armatus

Binomial name
- Cephonodes armatus Rothschild & Jordan, 1903

= Cephonodes armatus =

Species of moth

Cephonodes armatus is a moth of the family Sphingidae. It is known from Fiji and the northern Mariana Islands.

The upperside is deep green. It is similar to Cephonodes janus janus but abdominal segments five and six each have a small lateral red spot, or segment five has a complete red belt. The underside of the abdomen is yellow, greyish medially and laterally reddish. The forewing upperside has a marginal band.

== Subspecies ==
- Cephonodes armatus armatus (Fiji)
- Cephonodes armatus marianna Rothschild & Jordan, 1903 (Mariana Islands)
