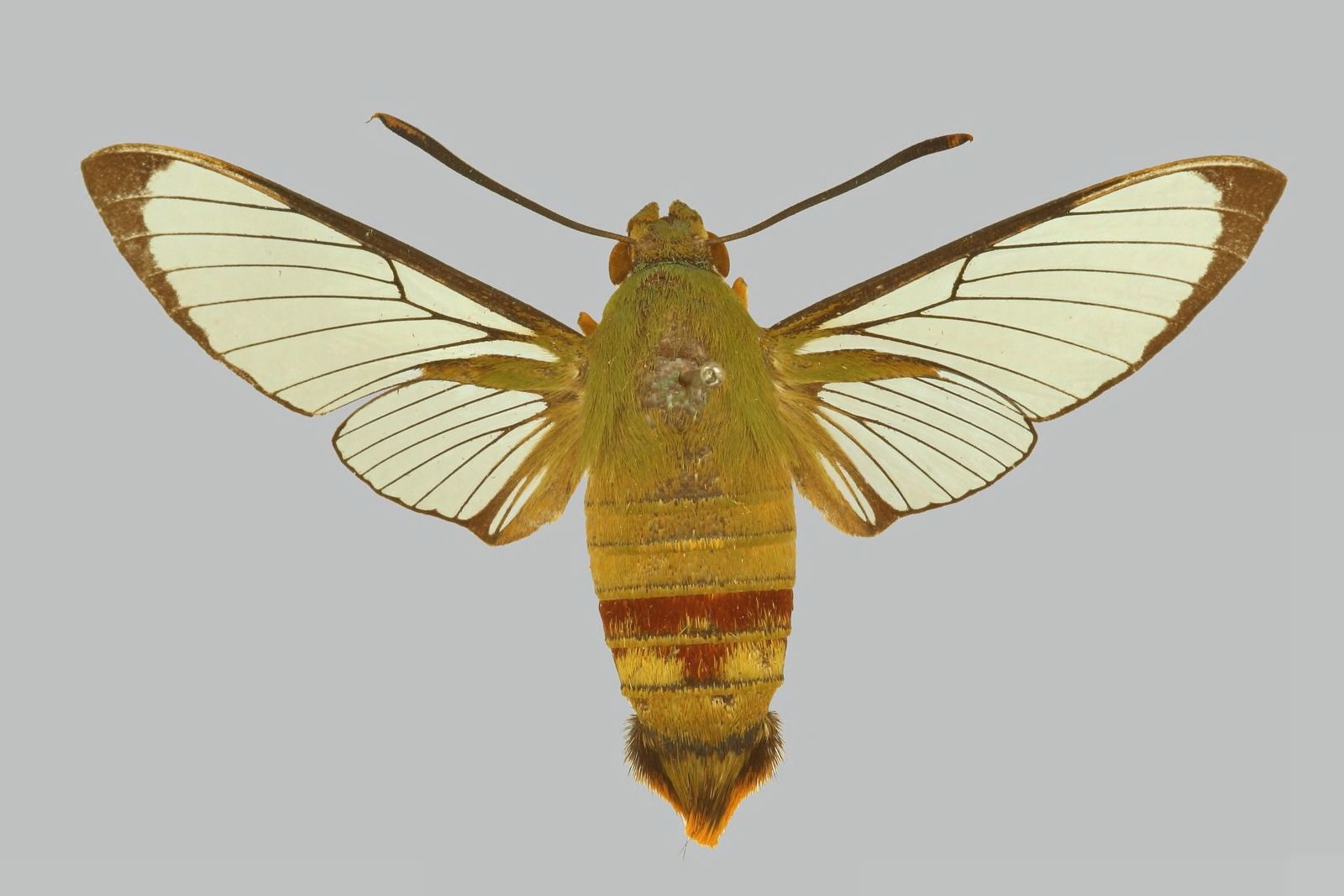
- Female

Scientific classification
- Domain: Eukaryota
- Kingdom: Animalia
- Phylum: Arthropoda
- Class: Insecta
- Order: Lepidoptera
- Family: Sphingidae
- Genus: Cephonodes
- Species: C. novebudensis

Binomial name
- Cephonodes novebudensis Clark, 1927

= Cephonodes novebudensis =

Species of moth

Cephonodes novebudensis is a moth of the family Sphingidae. It is known from Vanuatu.

The length of the forewings is about 23 mm. It is similar to Cephonodes lifuensis.
