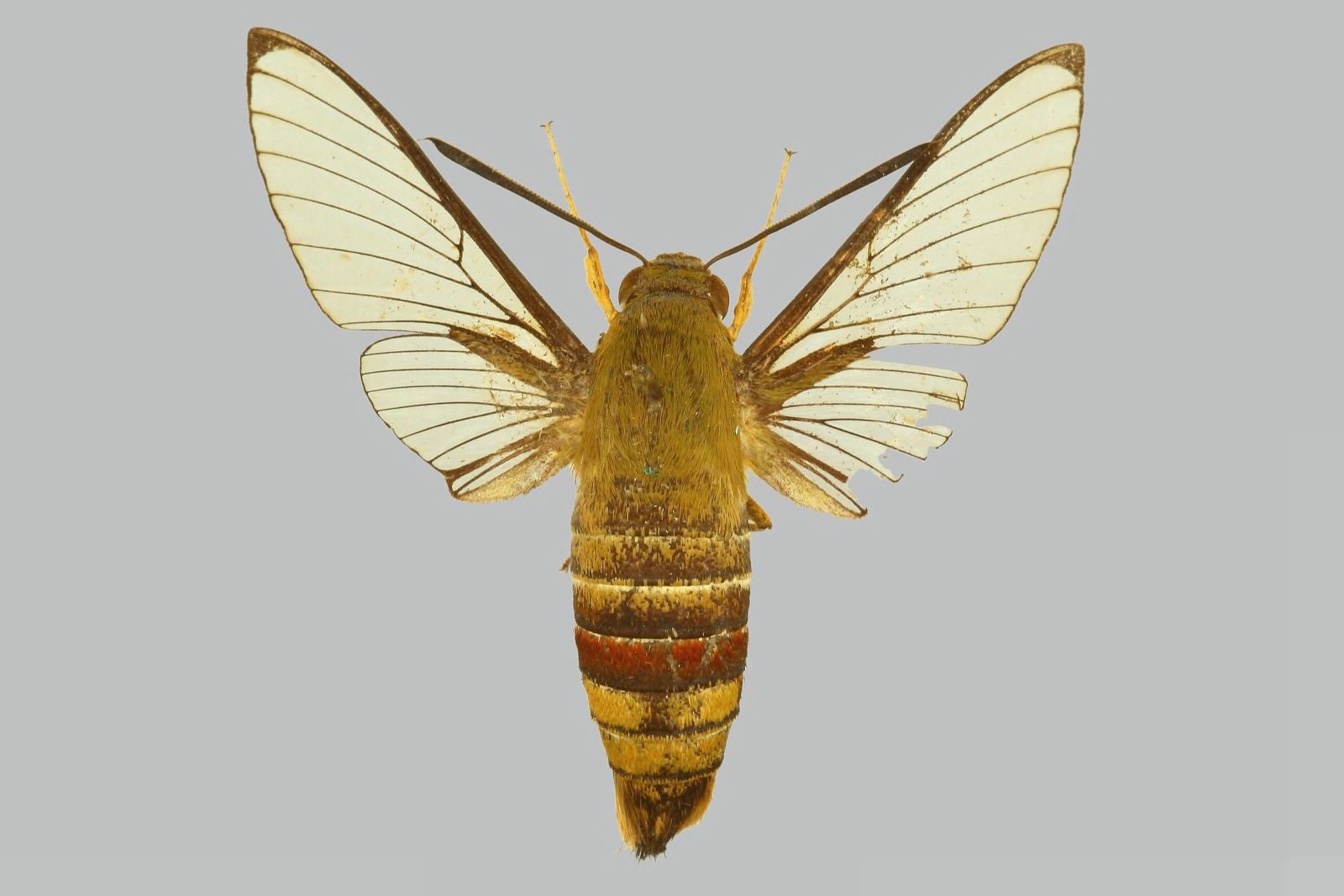
- Cephonodes woodfordii woodfordii, male

Scientific classification
- Domain: Eukaryota
- Kingdom: Animalia
- Phylum: Arthropoda
- Class: Insecta
- Order: Lepidoptera
- Family: Sphingidae
- Genus: Cephonodes
- Species: C. woodfordii

Binomial name
- Cephonodes woodfordii Butler, 1889

= Cephonodes woodfordii =

Species of moth

Cephonodes woodfordii is a moth of the family Sphingidae. It is known from Papua New Guinea, the Louisiade Archipelago and the Solomon Islands.

It is very similar to Cephonodes hylas hylas but larger and immediately distinguishable by the orange (not white) underside of the thorax. The underside of the head, thorax and legs are orange. The underside of the abdomen is black with small orange lateral and medial patches on each sternite. The anal tuft is largely black.

== Subspecies ==
- Cephonodes woodfordii woodfordii
- Cephonodes woodfordii luisae Rothschild & Jordan, 1903 (Papua New Guinea)
