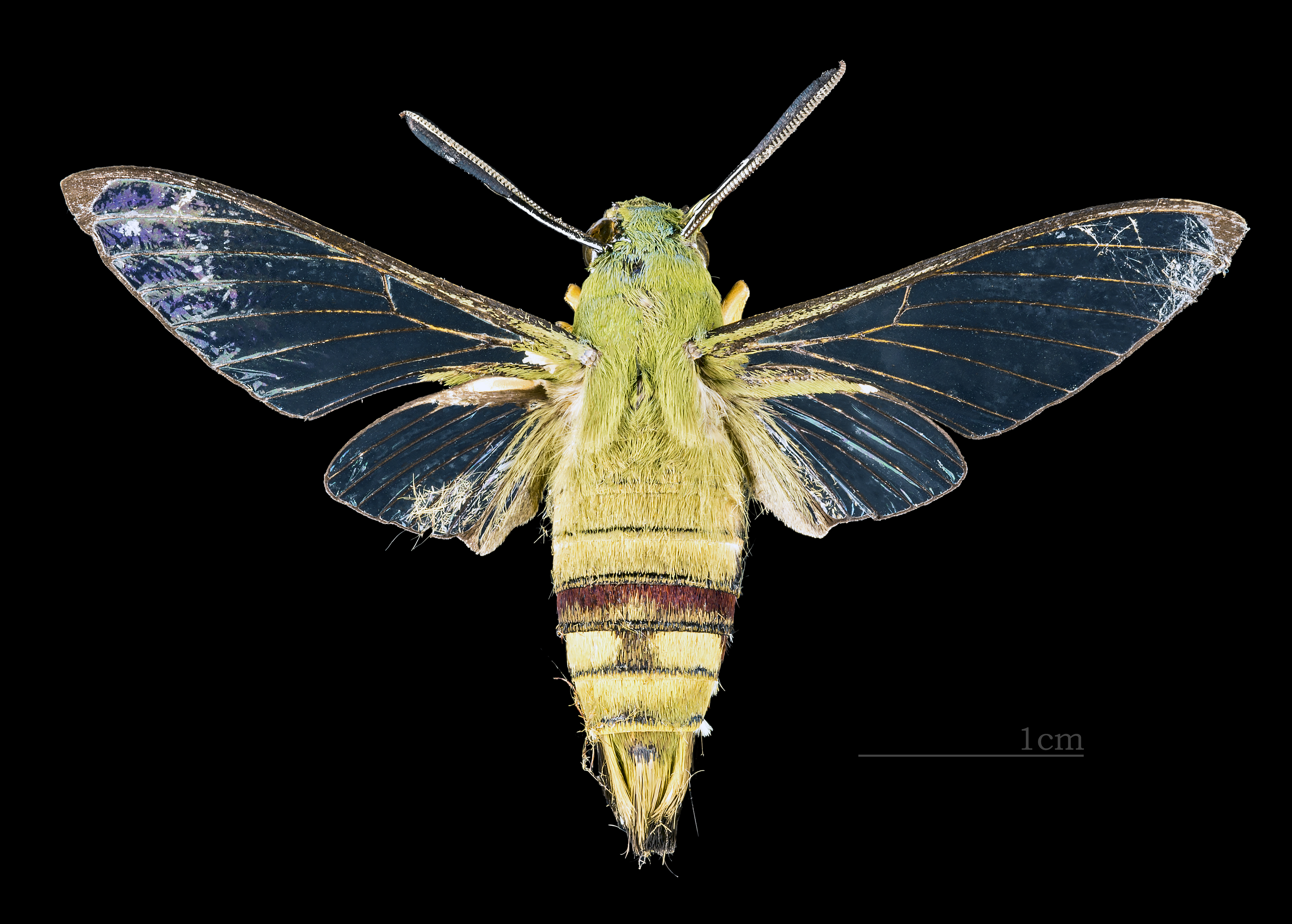
- Male dorsal
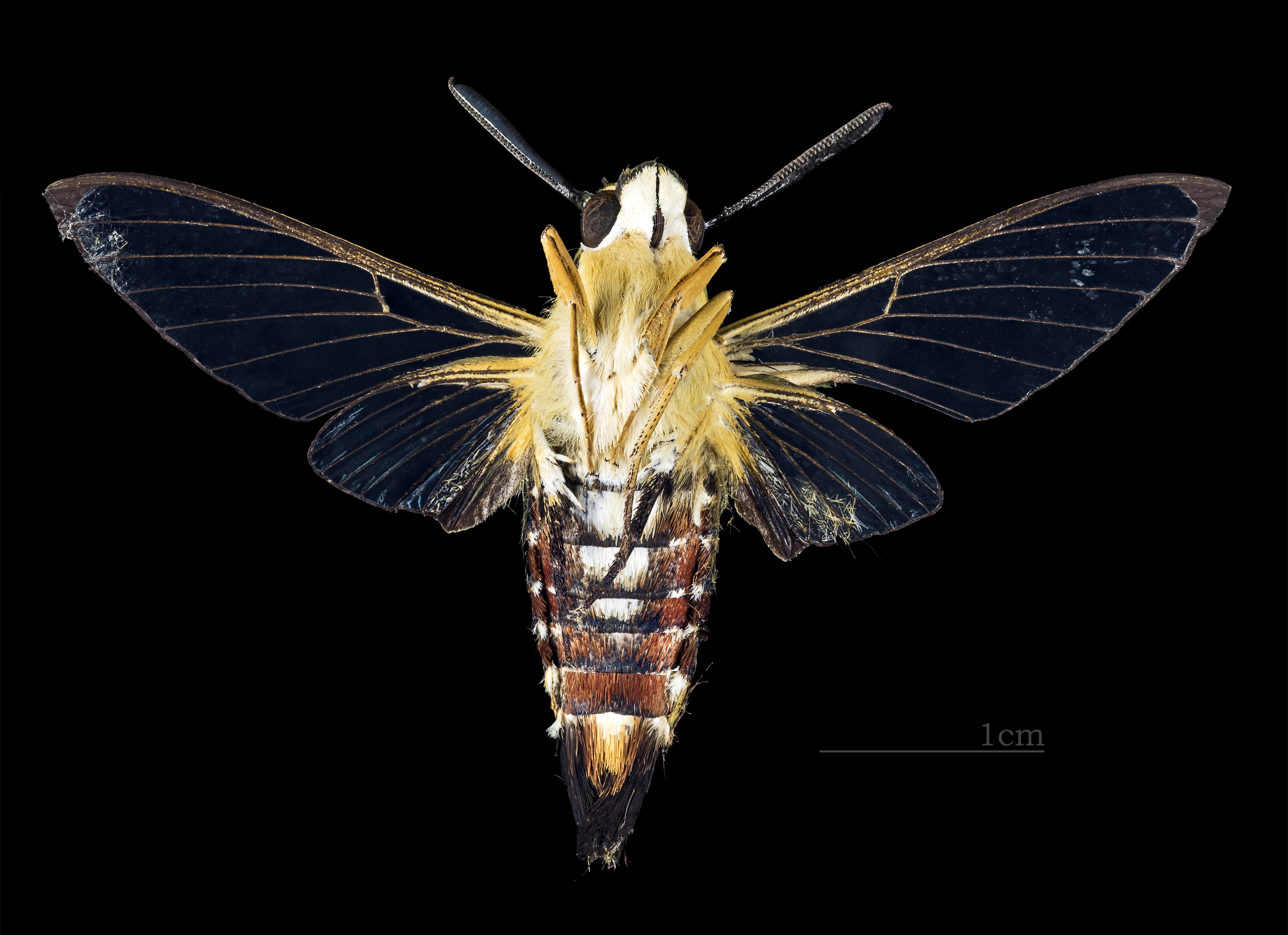
- Male ventral

Scientific classification
- Domain: Eukaryota
- Kingdom: Animalia
- Phylum: Arthropoda
- Class: Insecta
- Order: Lepidoptera
- Family: Sphingidae
- Genus: Cephonodes
- Species: C. picus

Binomial name
- Cephonodes picus (Cramer, 1777)

Synonyms
- Sphinx picus Cramer, 1777; Sesia cunninghami Walker, 1856; Macroglossa yunx Boisduval, 1875

= Cephonodes picus =

Species of moth

Cephonodes picus or Green Bumble-bee Hawkmoth is a moth of the family Sphingidae described by Pieter Cramer in 1777. It is found in most of the Old World tropics, including India, the Cocos-Keeling Islands, the Maldives, Papua New Guinea, the Philippines, the Torres Strait Islands, Brunei and the Chagos Archipelago.

The wingspan is about 50 mm.

The larvae have been recorded on Jasminum, Adina, Coffea, Gardenia, Guettarda, Morinda, Pavetta, Randia, Tarema and Nephelium. They are green with a bluish white dorsal line and white dorsolateral ones.
