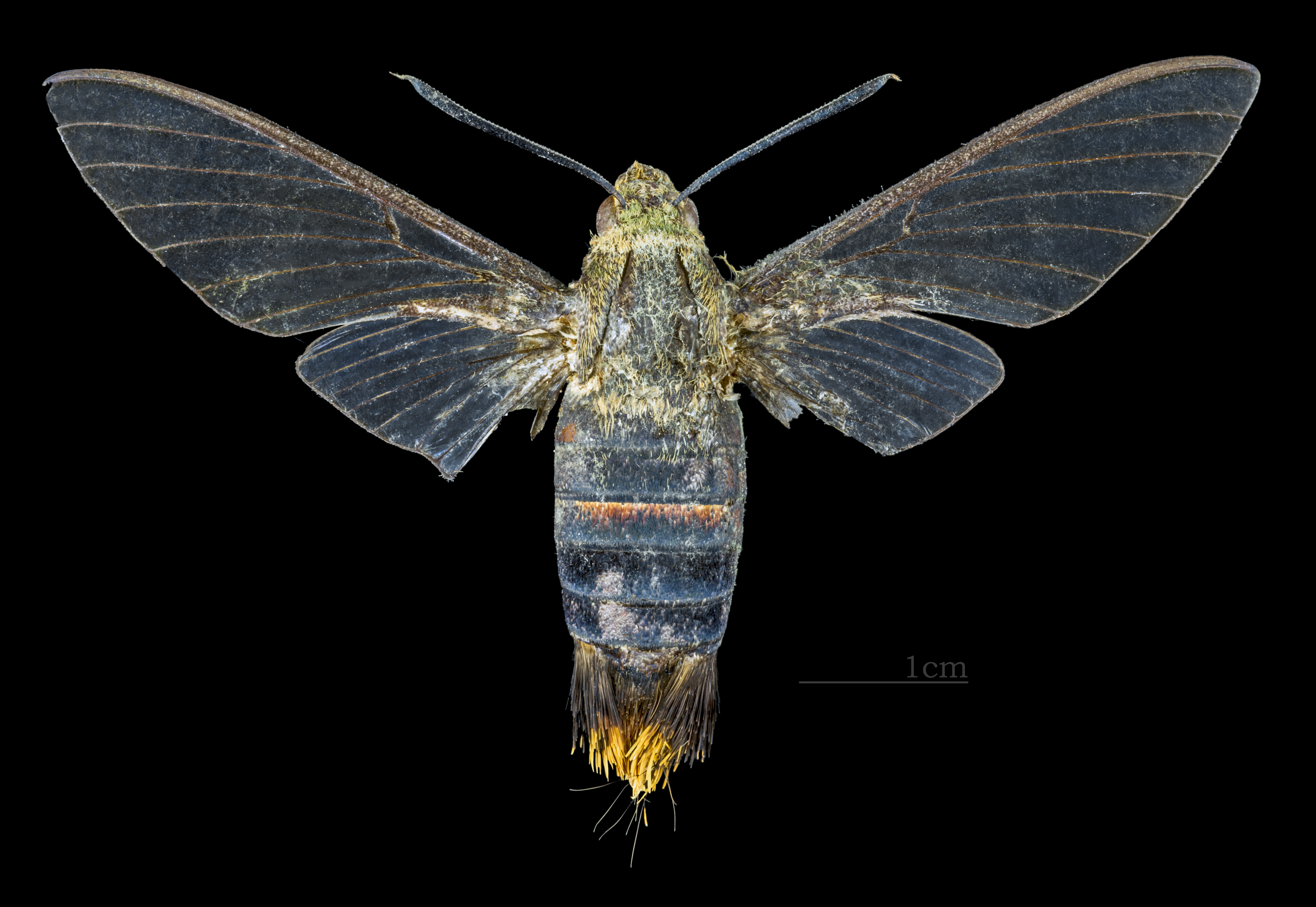
- Cephonodes banksi dorsal
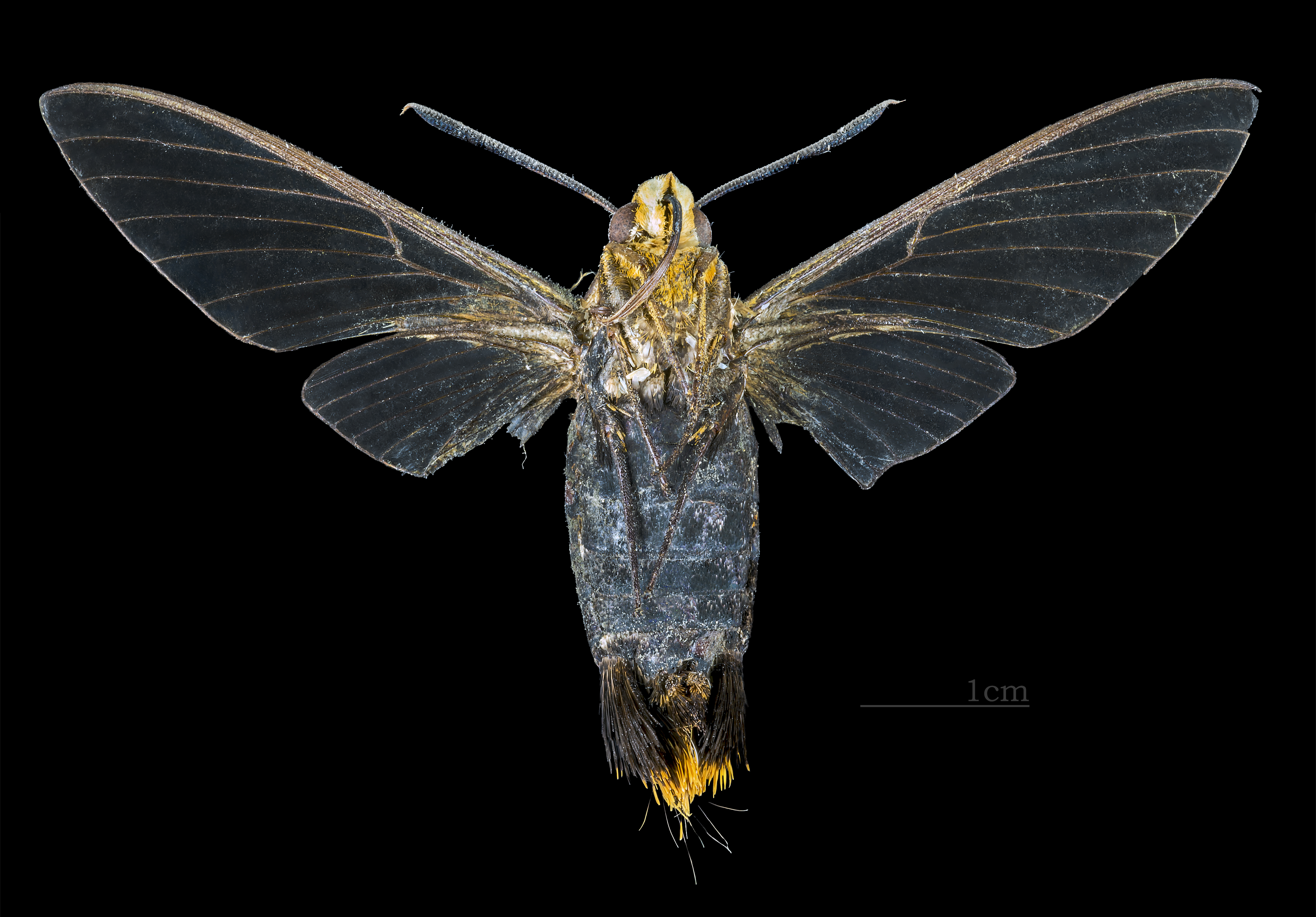
- Cephonodes banksi ventral

Scientific classification
- Domain: Eukaryota
- Kingdom: Animalia
- Phylum: Arthropoda
- Class: Insecta
- Order: Lepidoptera
- Family: Sphingidae
- Genus: Cephonodes
- Species: C. banksi

Binomial name
- Cephonodes banksi Clark, 1923

= Cephonodes banksi =

Species of moth

Cephonodes banksi is a moth of the family Sphingidae.

== Distribution ==
It is known from the Philippines and Sulawesi.

== Description ==
The upperside of the abdomen is tri-coloured (the anterior is dark green, the median reddish-orange with a cream band and the posterior is brownish-orange/black). The abdomen upperside has a prominent transverse white line preceding a reddish-orange band. The rear part of the abdomen (posterior to the reddish-orange band) is brownish-orange. The head, anterior part of the thorax, forelegs and midlegs are bright orange. Females are larger and darker than males.

== Subspecies ==
- Cephonodes banksi banksi (Philippines)
- Cephonodes banksi johani Cadiou, 1999 (Sulawesi)
