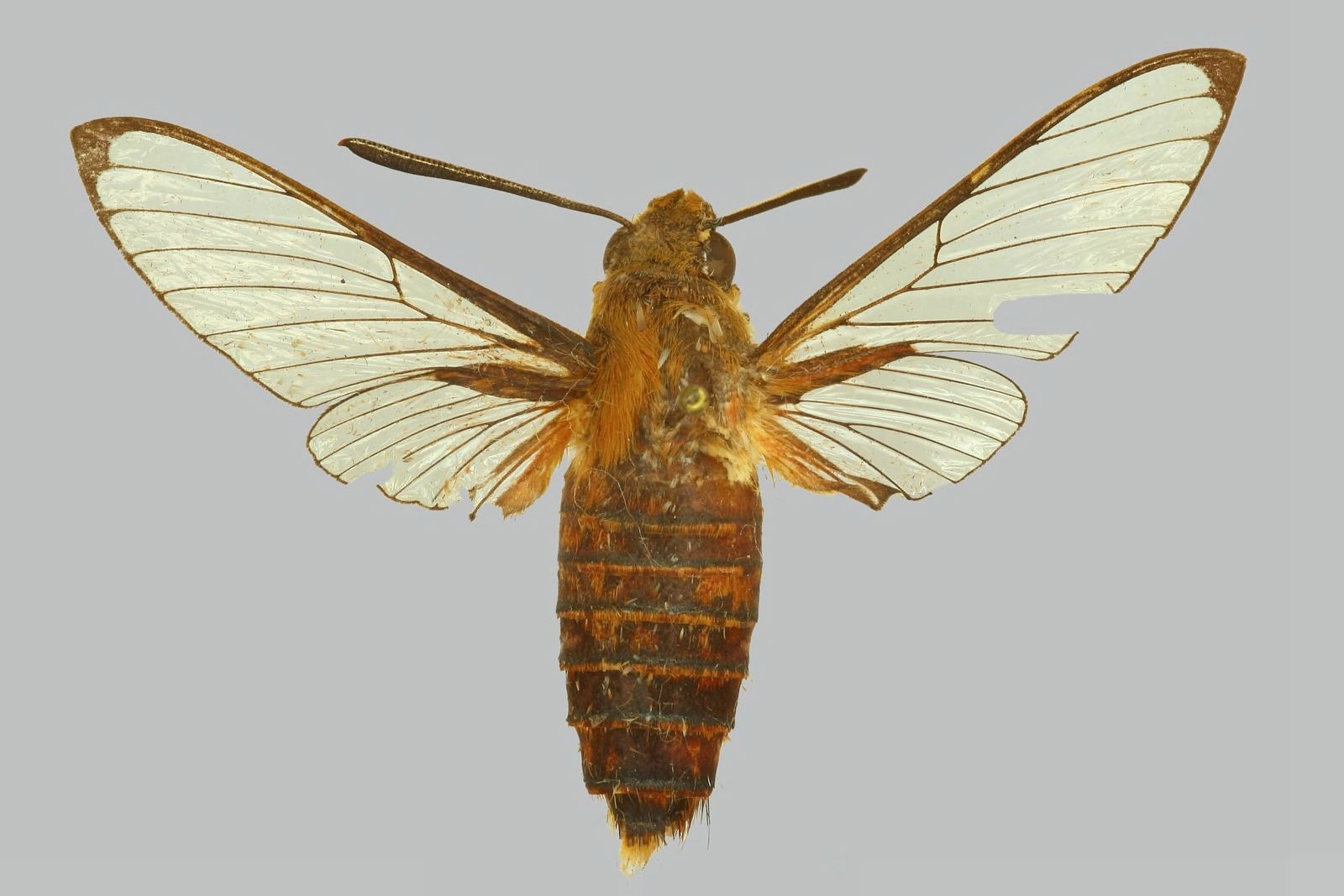
- Female

Scientific classification
- Domain: Eukaryota
- Kingdom: Animalia
- Phylum: Arthropoda
- Class: Insecta
- Order: Lepidoptera
- Family: Sphingidae
- Genus: Cephonodes
- Species: C. rufescens

Binomial name
- Cephonodes rufescens Griveaud, 1960

= Cephonodes rufescens =

Species of moth

Cephonodes rufescens is a moth of the family Sphingidae. It is known from Madagascar.

The upperside of the head, thorax and wing bases is unicolorous brown. The abdomen is reddish mixed with brown.
