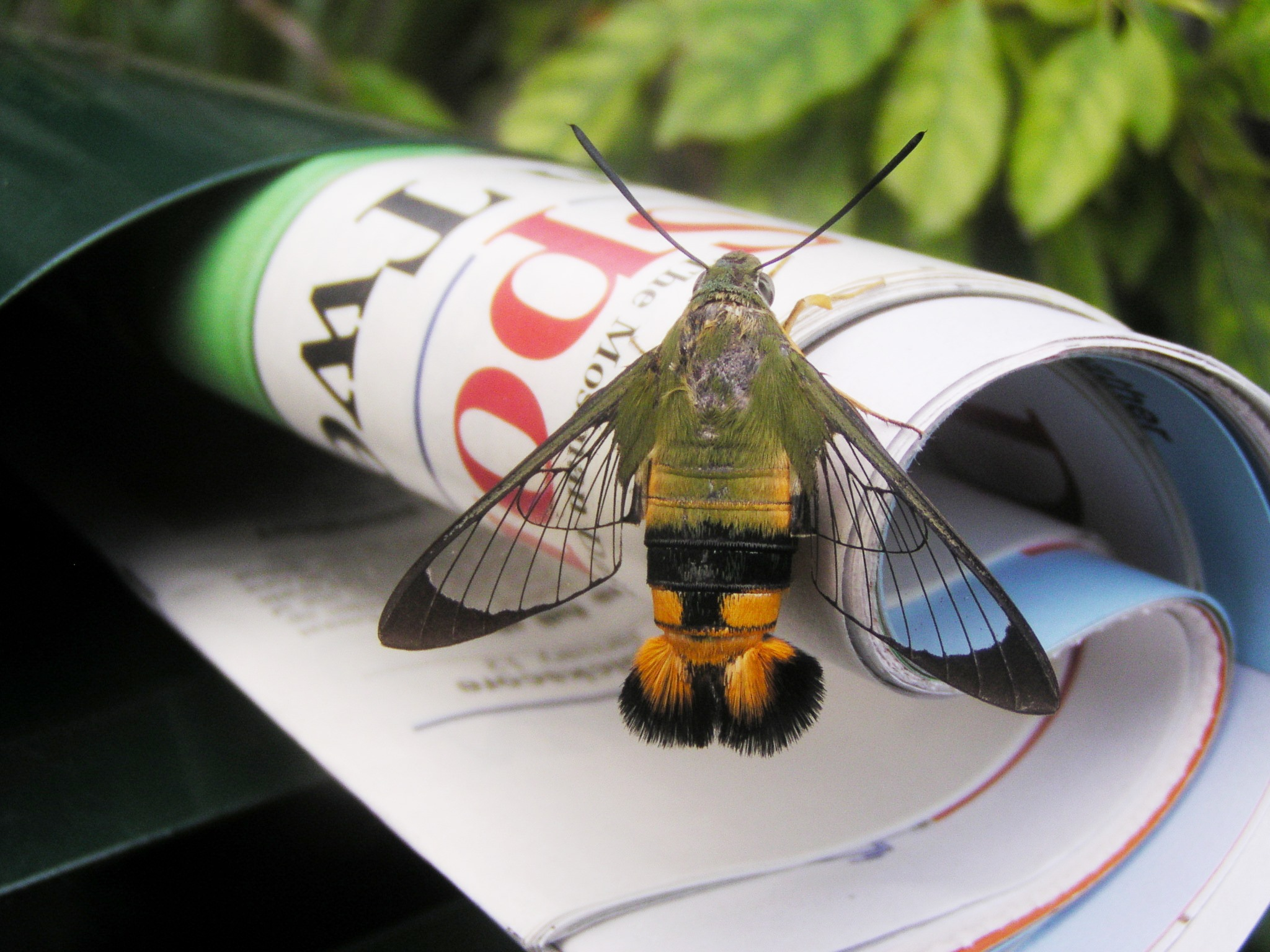

Scientific classification
- Domain: Eukaryota
- Kingdom: Animalia
- Phylum: Arthropoda
- Class: Insecta
- Order: Lepidoptera
- Family: Sphingidae
- Genus: Cephonodes
- Species: C. kingii

Binomial name
- Cephonodes kingii (W.S. Macleay, 1826)

Synonyms
- Macroglossum kingii W.S. Macleay, 1826; Cephonodes bucklandii Butler, 1884

= Cephonodes kingii =

Species of moth

Cephonodes kingii, the gardenia bee hawk, is a moth of the family Sphingidae.

== Distribution ==
It is found in the northern two thirds of Australia.

== Description ==
The wingspan is about 40 mm.

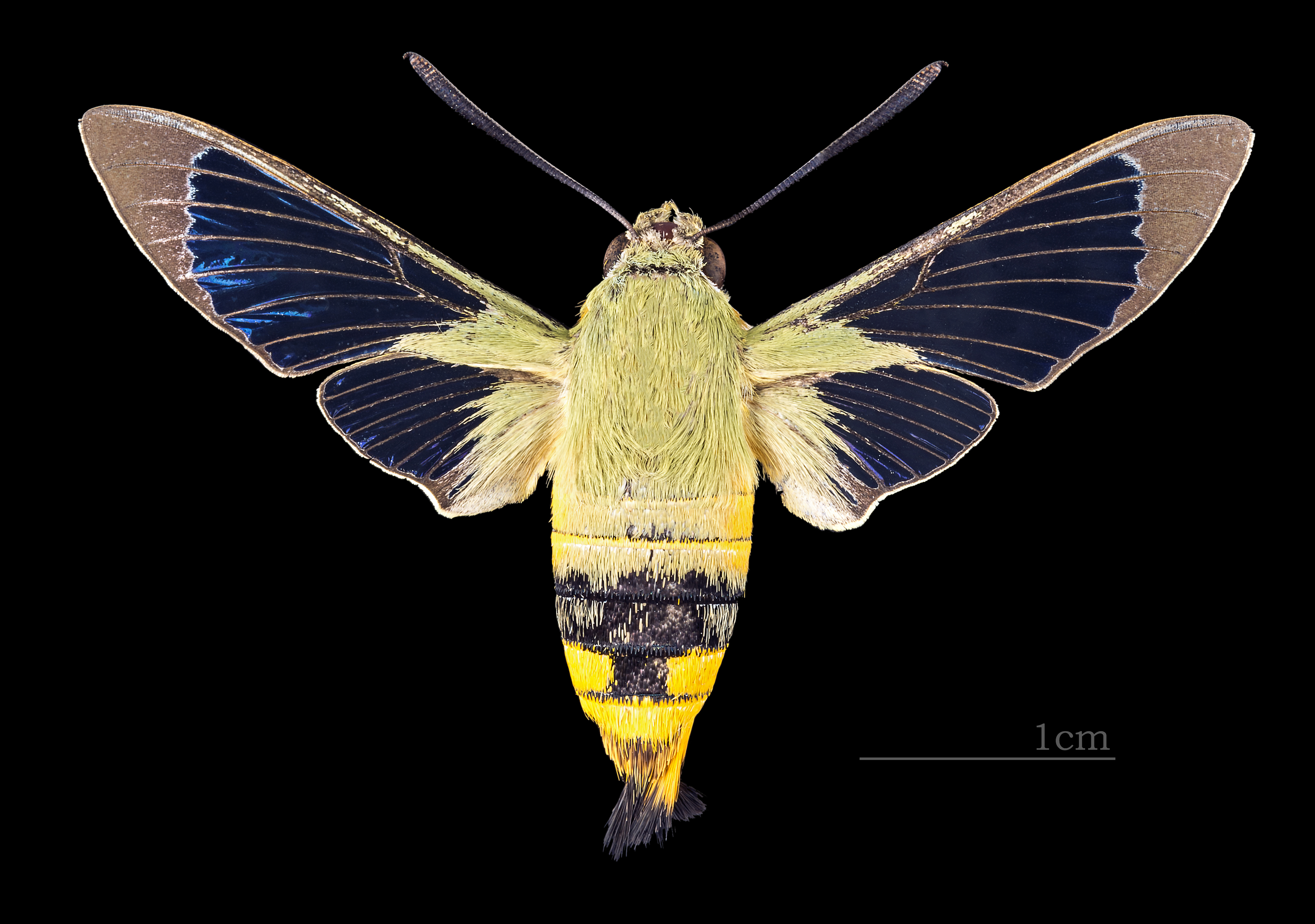
Dorsal (coll.MHNT)

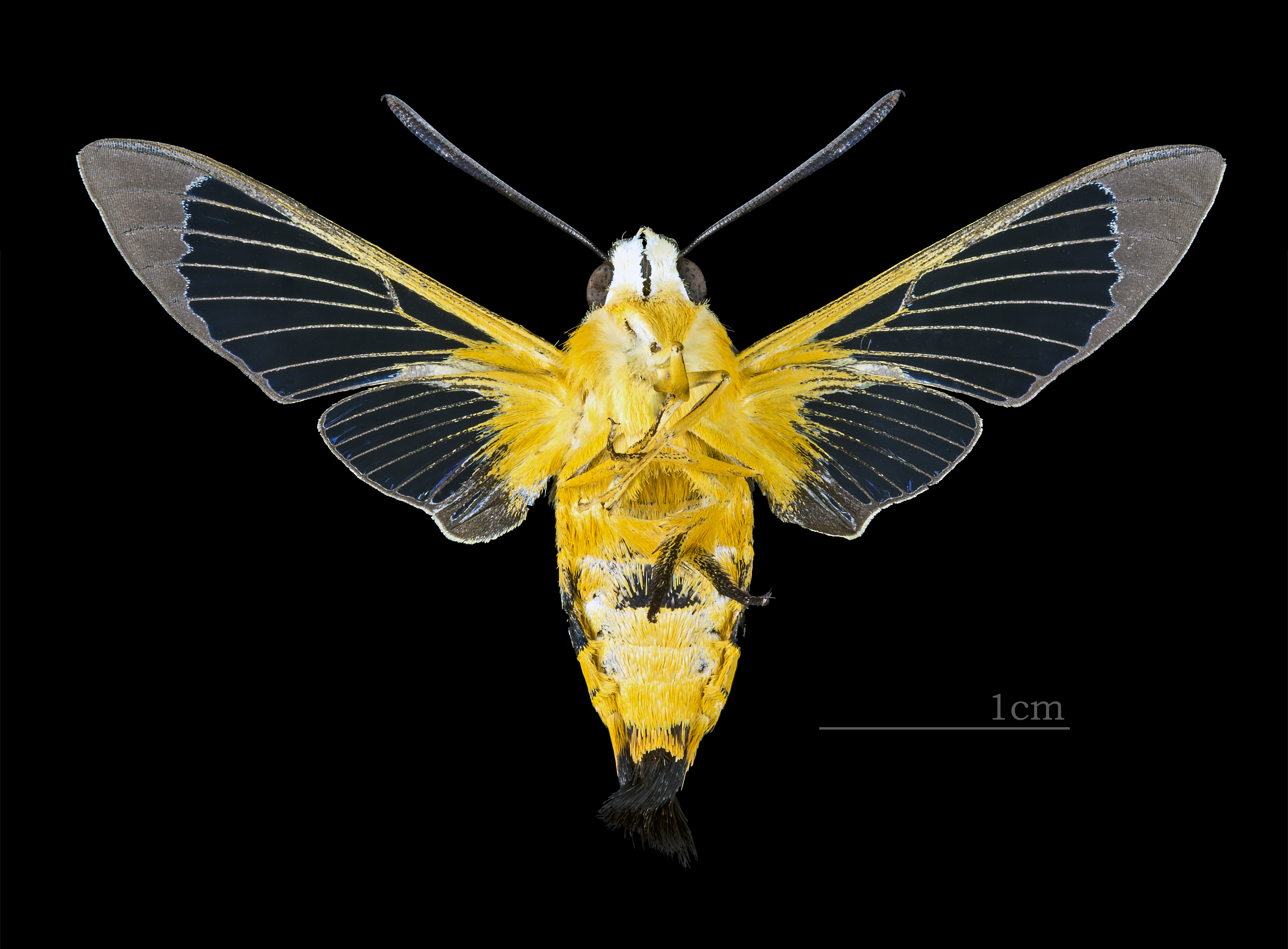
Ventral (coll.MHNT)

== Biology ==
Adults feed on flower nectar.

The larvae have been recorded on Gardenia jasminoides, Canthium attenuatum, Canthium coprosmoides, Canthium odoratum, Canthium oleifolium, Gardenia ovularis, Gardenia ochreata, Pavetta australiensis, Medicago sativa and Citrus limon.
