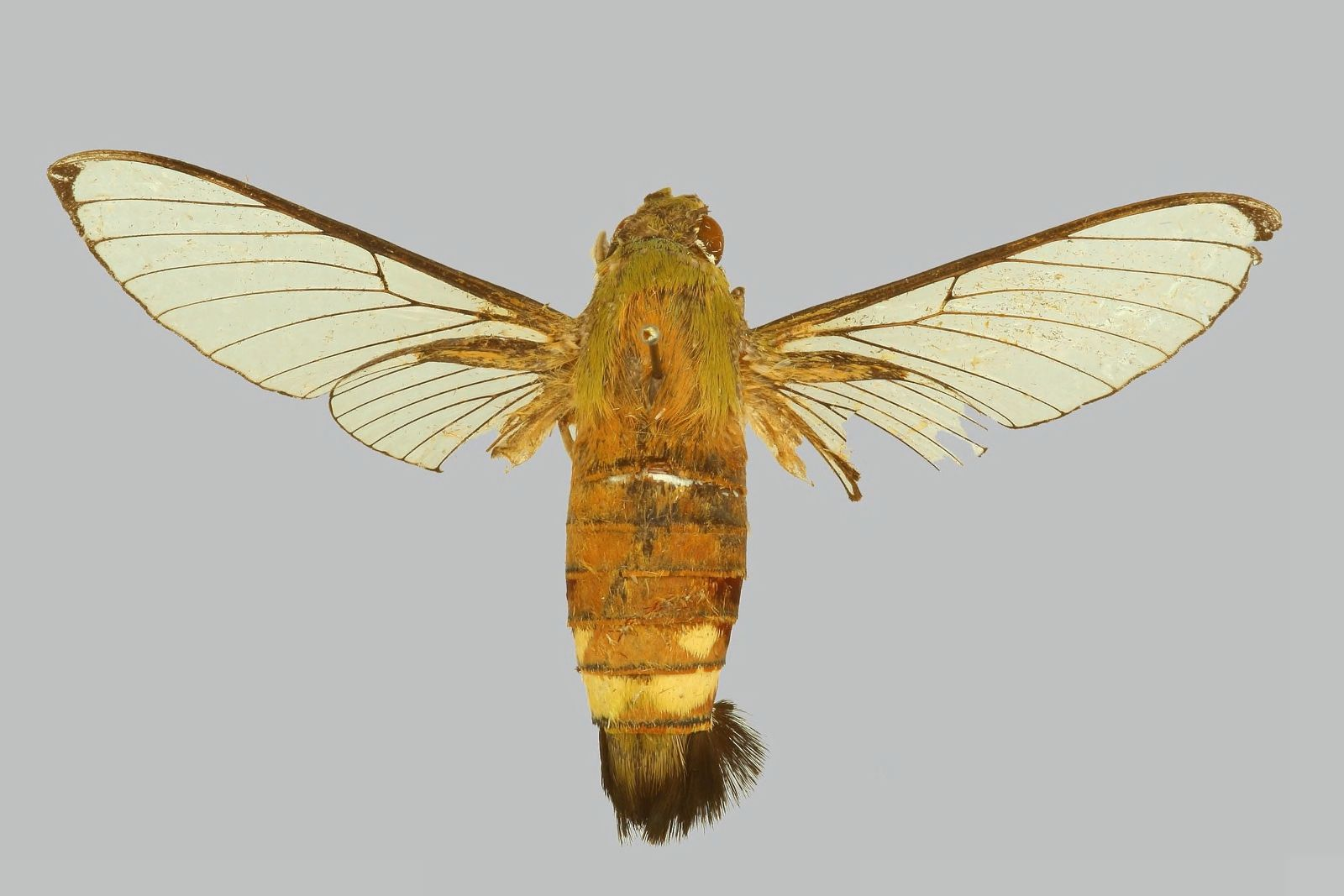
- Male

Scientific classification
- Domain: Eukaryota
- Kingdom: Animalia
- Phylum: Arthropoda
- Class: Insecta
- Order: Lepidoptera
- Family: Sphingidae
- Genus: Cephonodes
- Species: C. leucogaster

Binomial name
- Cephonodes leucogaster Rothschild & Jordan, 1903

= Cephonodes leucogaster =

Species of moth

Cephonodes leucogaster is a moth of the family Sphingidae. It is known from Madagascar.
