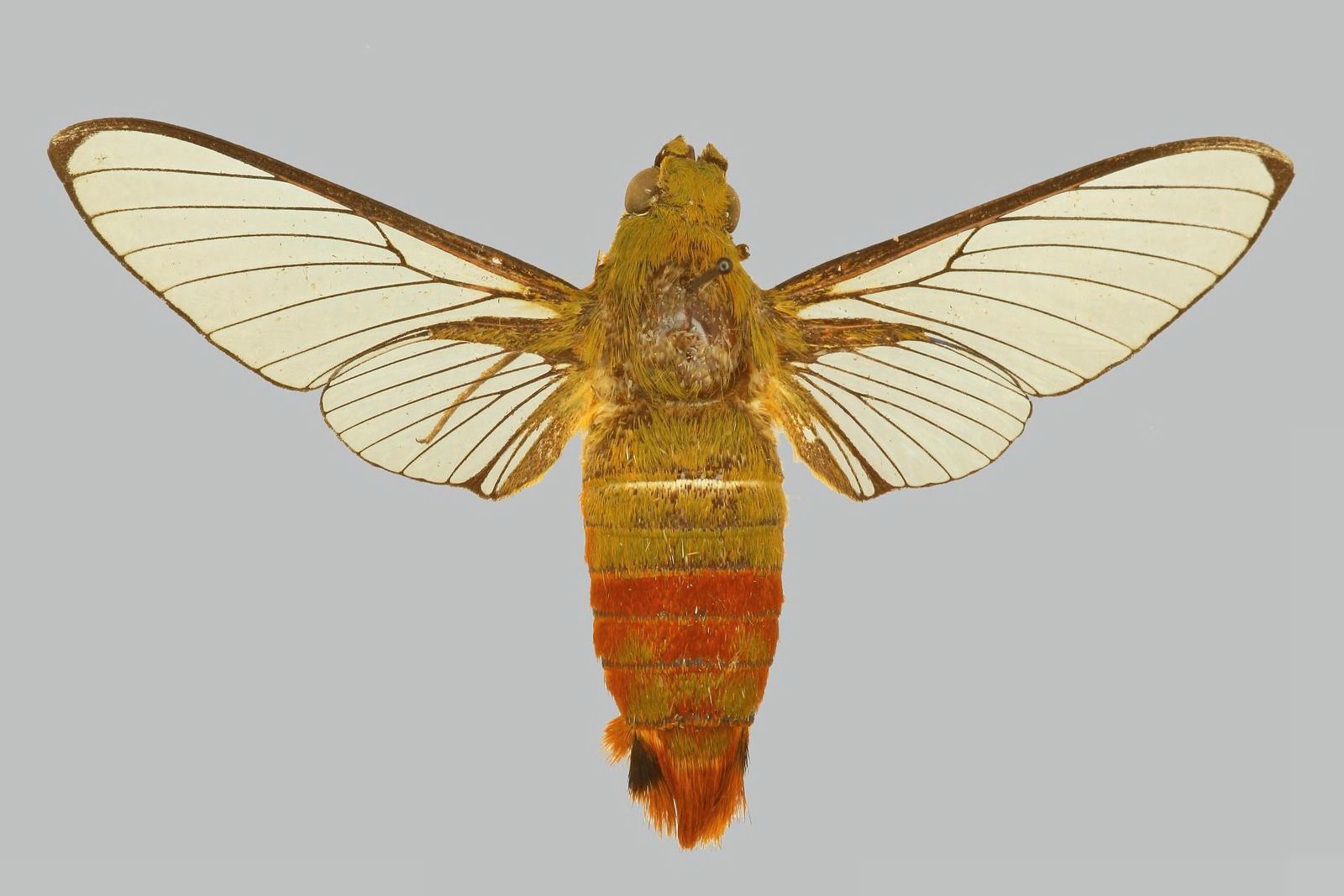
- Male

Scientific classification
- Kingdom: Animalia
- Phylum: Arthropoda
- Clade: Pancrustacea
- Class: Insecta
- Order: Lepidoptera
- Family: Sphingidae
- Genus: Cephonodes
- Species: C. apus

Binomial name
- Cephonodes apus (Boisduval, 1833)

Synonyms
- Macroglossa apus Boisduval, 1833

= Cephonodes apus =

Species of moth

Cephonodes apus is a moth of the family Sphingidae. It is known from the Islands of Réunion and Mauritius.

The upperside of the abdomen is bicoloured, the anterior half green, the posterior half red. The upperside of the head, thorax, wing bases and first four abdominal segments are unicolorous green. Abdominal segment five is red, segment six to eight are red mixed with green. The abdominal tuft is orange-brown. The underside of the abdomen is mixed pale yellow and pale orange.

The larvae feed on Antirhea borbonica.
