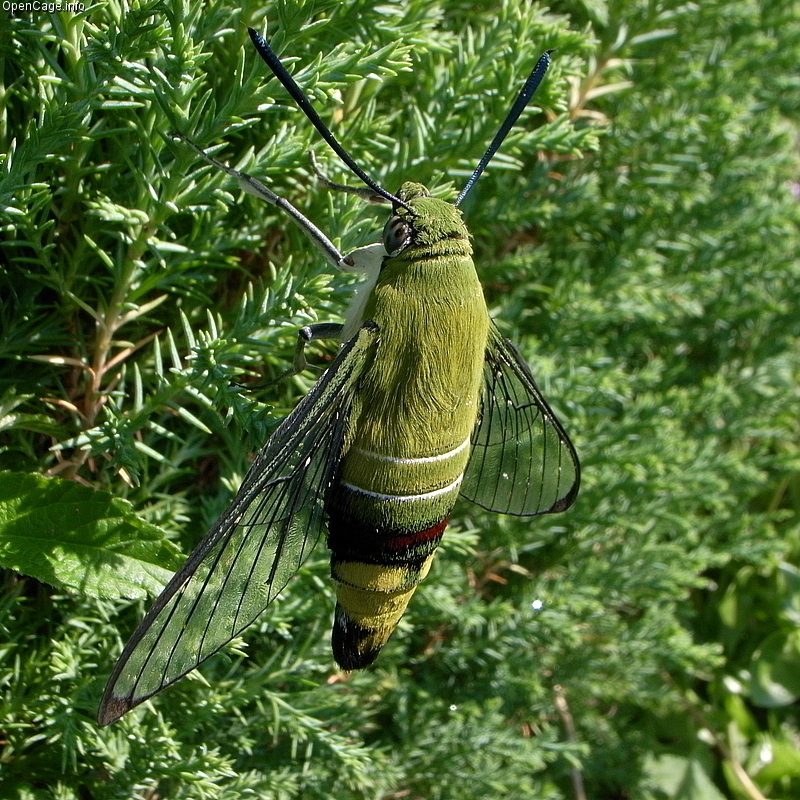
- Cephonodes hylas

Scientific classification
- Domain: Eukaryota
- Kingdom: Animalia
- Phylum: Arthropoda
- Class: Insecta
- Order: Lepidoptera
- Family: Sphingidae
- Subtribe: Hemarina
- Genus: Cephonodes; Hübner, 1819

Synonyms
- Potidaea Wallengren, 1858

= Cephonodes =

Genus of moths

Cephonodes is a genus of moths in the family Sphingidae. (Cephanodes is a frequent misspelling.) The genus was erected by Jacob Hübner in 1819.

== Species ==
- Cephonodes apus (Boisduval, 1833)
- Cephonodes armatus Rothschild & Jordan, 1903
- Cephonodes banksi Clark 1923
- Cephonodes hylas (Linnaeus, 1771)
- Cephonodes janus Miskin, 1891
- Cephonodes kingii (W. S. Macleay, 1826)
- Cephonodes leucogaster Rothschild & Jordan, 1903
- Cephonodes lifuensis Rothschild, 1894
- Cephonodes novebudensis Clark, 1927
- Cephonodes picus (Cramer, 1777)
- Cephonodes rothschildi Rebel, 1907
- Cephonodes rufescens Griveaud, 1960
- Cephonodes santome Pierre, 2002
- Cephonodes tamsi Griveaud, 1960
- Cephonodes titan Rothschild, 1899
- Cephonodes trochilus (Guerin-Meneville, 1843)
- Cephonodes woodfordii Butler, 1889
- Cephonodes xanthus Rothschild & Jordan, 1903

== Gallery ==
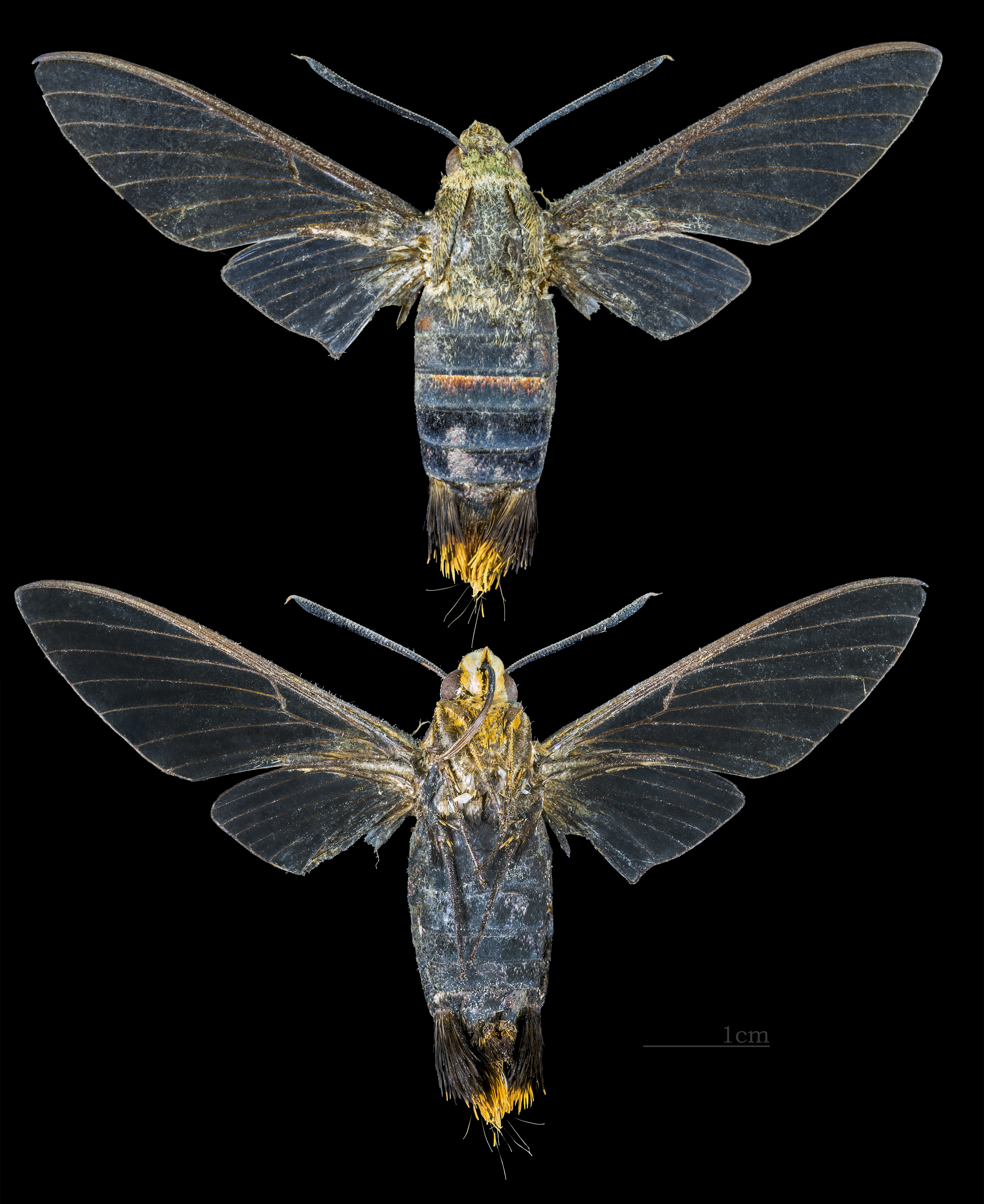
Cephonodes banksi

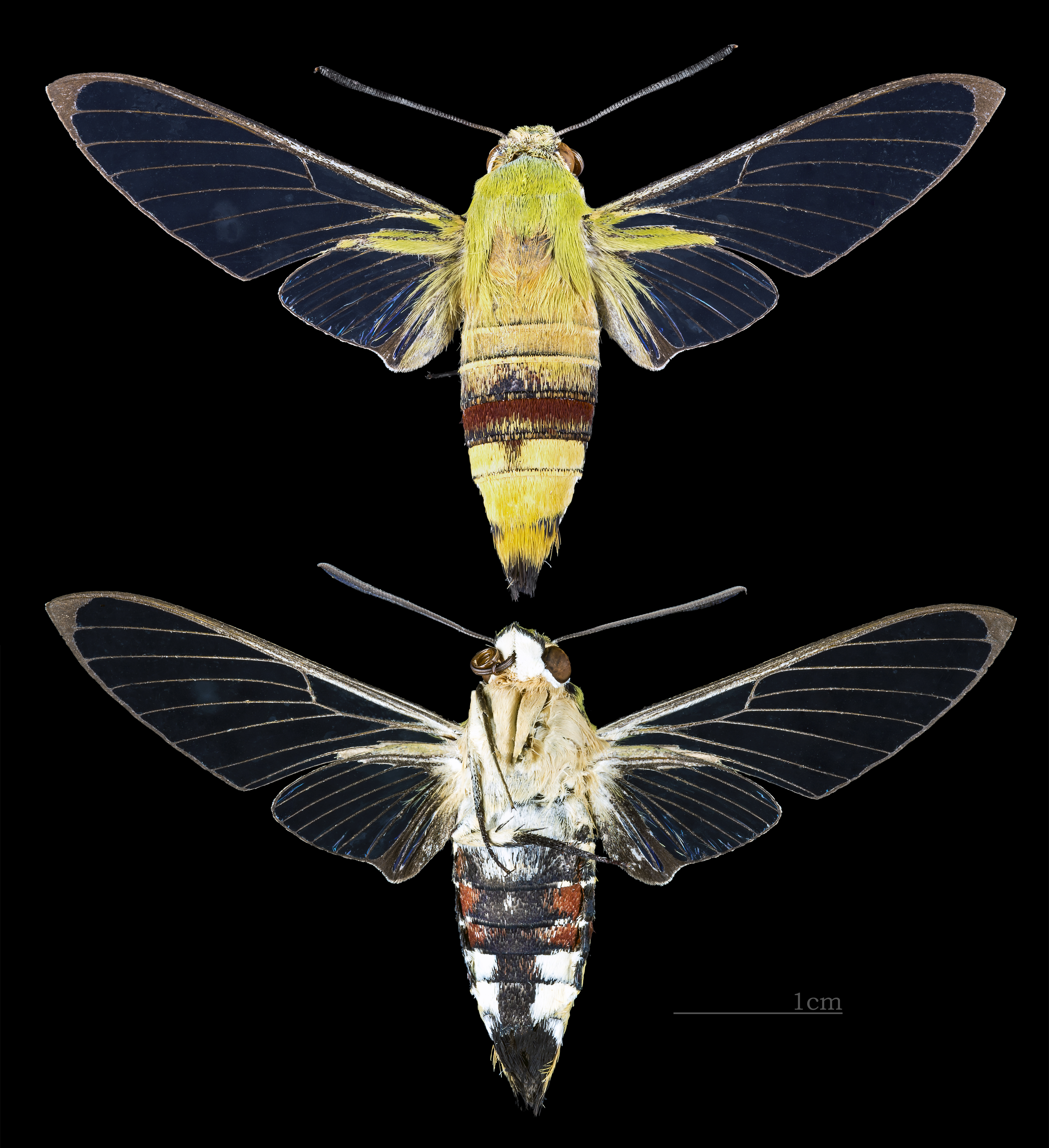
Cephonodes hylas

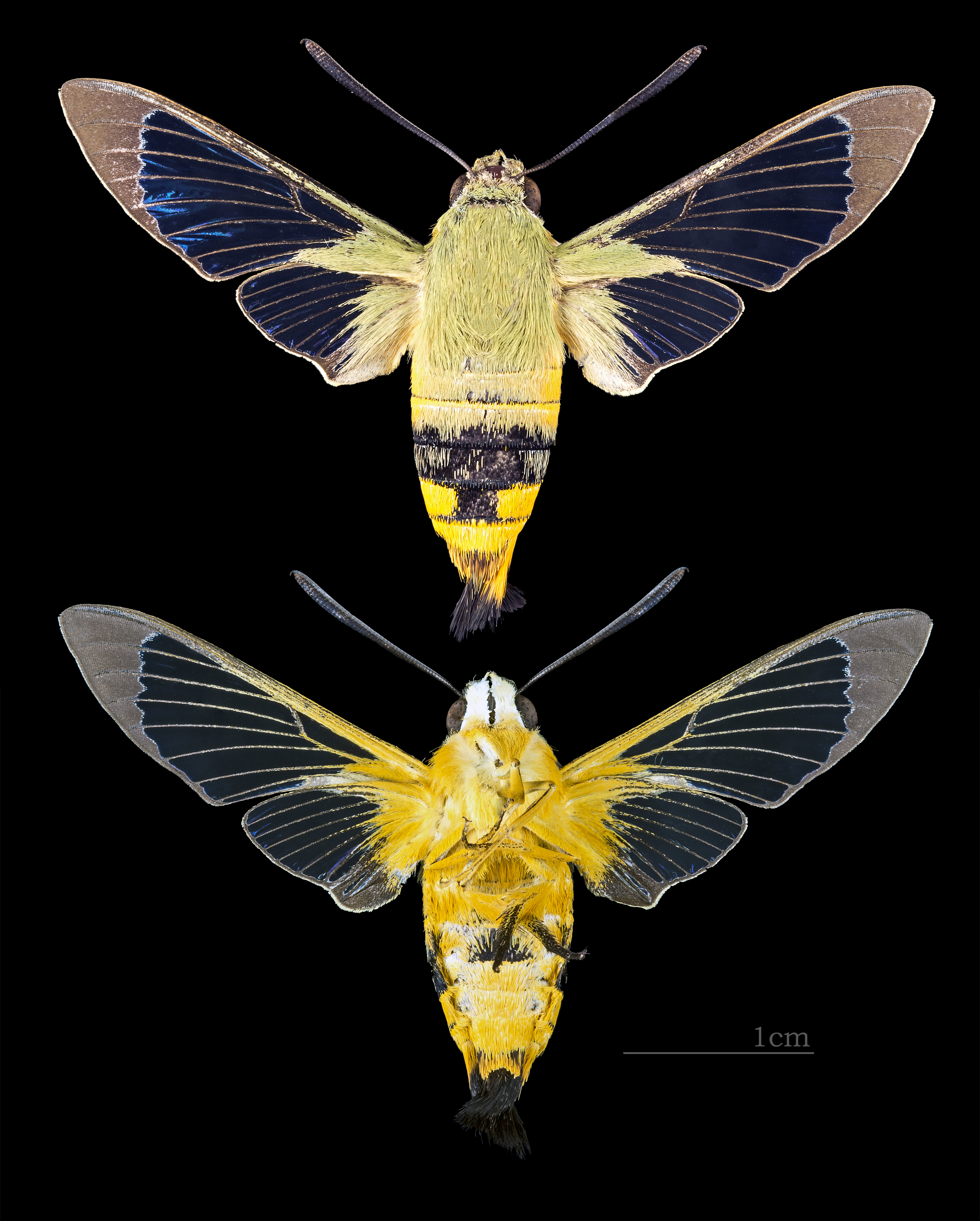
Cephonodes kingii

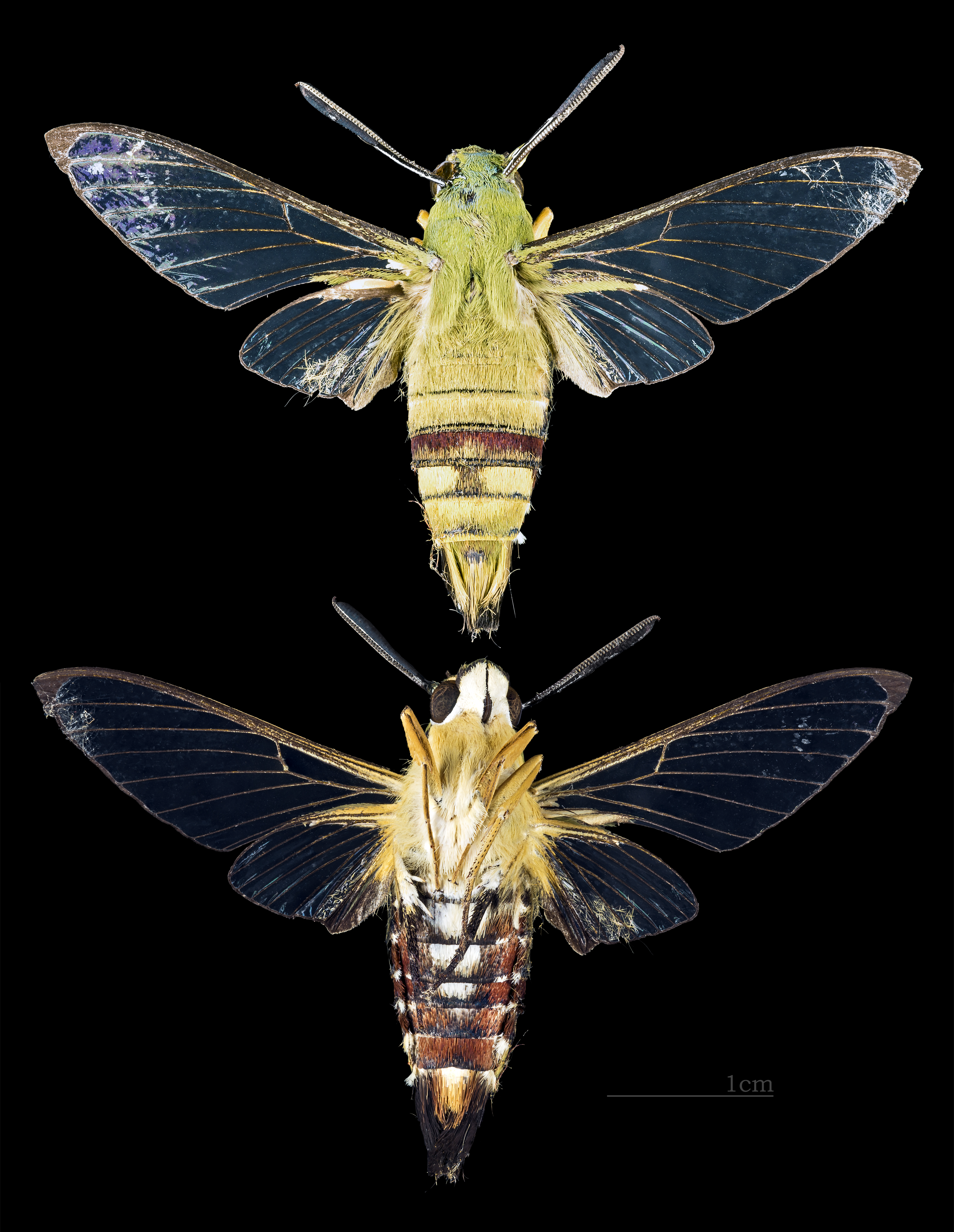
Cephonodes picus
