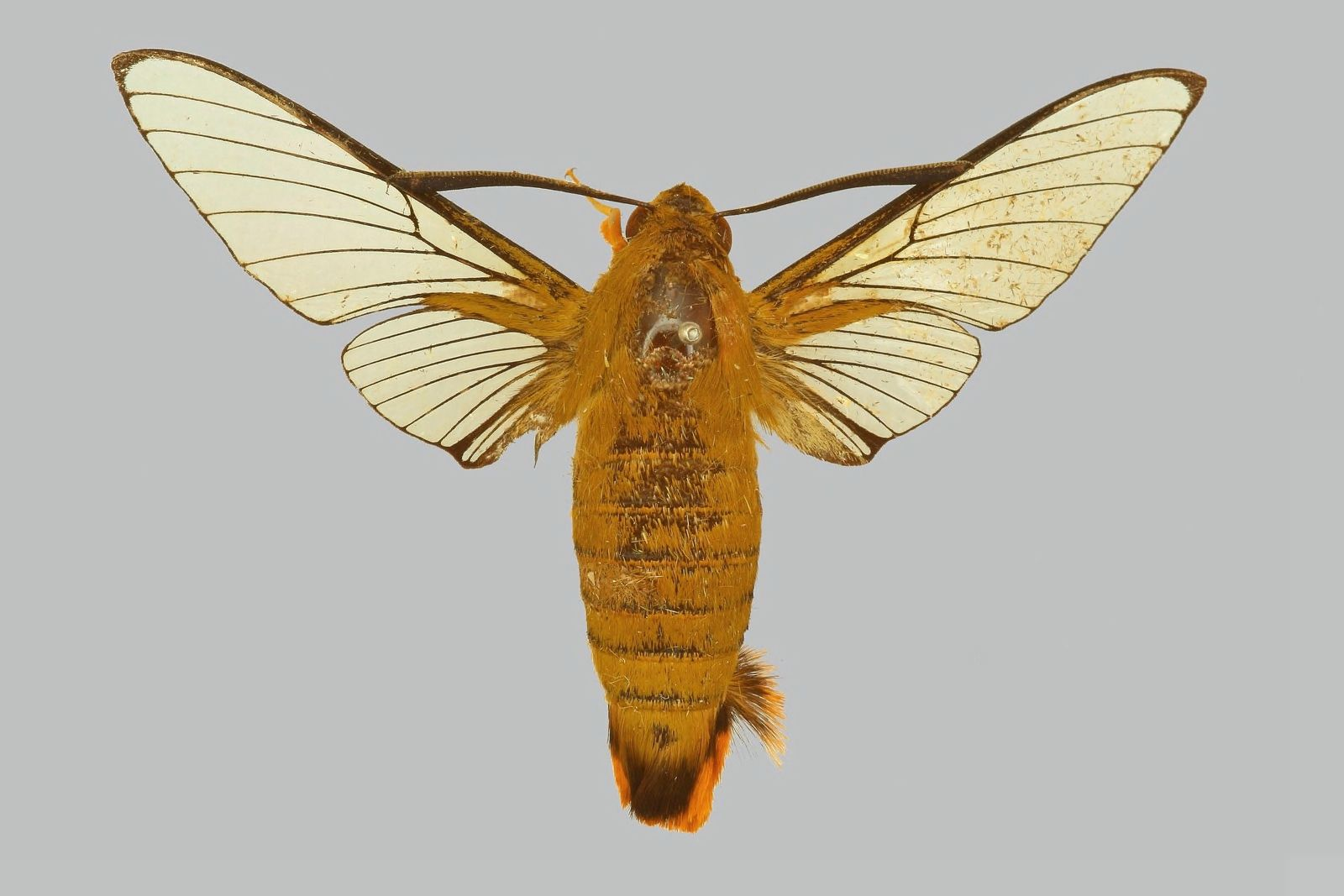
- Male

Scientific classification
- Domain: Eukaryota
- Kingdom: Animalia
- Phylum: Arthropoda
- Class: Insecta
- Order: Lepidoptera
- Family: Sphingidae
- Genus: Cephonodes
- Species: C. rothschildi

Binomial name
- Cephonodes rothschildi Rebel, 1907

= Cephonodes rothschildi =

Species of moth

Cephonodes rothschildi is a moth of the family Sphingidae. It is known from the Star Mountains in Papua New Guinea.
