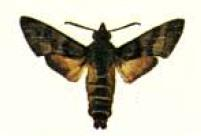

Scientific classification
- Domain: Eukaryota
- Kingdom: Animalia
- Phylum: Arthropoda
- Class: Insecta
- Order: Lepidoptera
- Family: Sphingidae
- Genus: Cephonodes
- Species: C. trochilus

Binomial name
- Cephonodes trochilus (Guérin-Méneville, 1843)

Synonyms
- Macroglossum trochilus Guérin-Méneville, 1843; Macroglossum cynniris Guérin-Méneville, 1844

= Cephonodes trochilus =

Species of moth

Cephonodes trochilus is a moth of the family Sphingidae. It is often found in Mauritius.

The wingspan is 38–41 mm. It is very similar to Cephonodes tamsi, but distinguishable by the brownish rather than reddish upperside of the abdomen. The upperside of the head, thorax and wing bases are unicolorous green. The abdomen is uniformly brownish. The underside of the thorax and abdomen are uniform orange-yellow, the anal tuft yellow and the tip orange-brown, laterally partly black.

The larvae feed on Rubia and Galium species.
