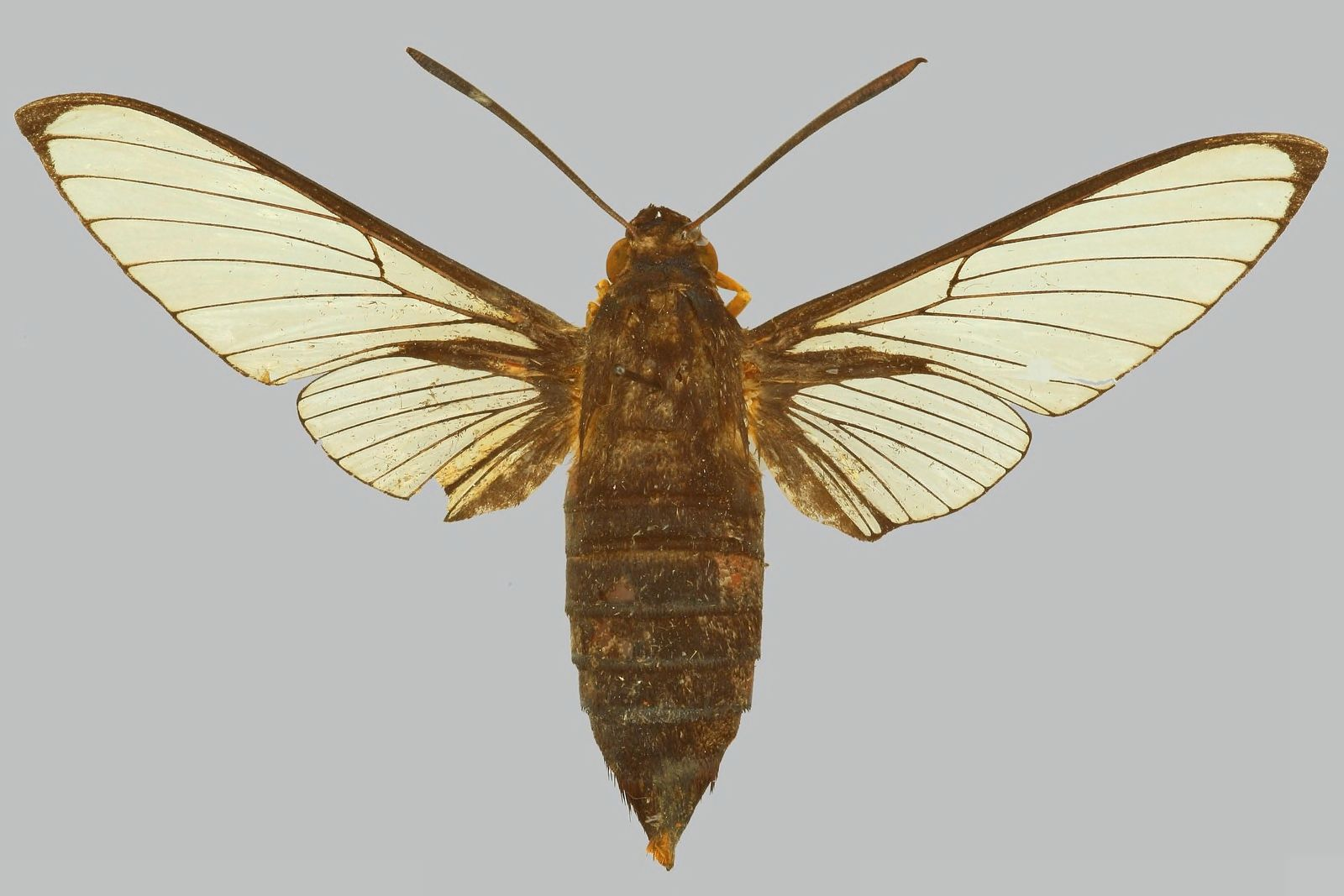
- Male

Scientific classification
- Domain: Eukaryota
- Kingdom: Animalia
- Phylum: Arthropoda
- Class: Insecta
- Order: Lepidoptera
- Family: Sphingidae
- Genus: Cephonodes
- Species: C. titan

Binomial name
- Cephonodes titan Rothschild, 1899

= Cephonodes titan =

Species of moth

Cephonodes titan is a moth of the family Sphingidae. It is known from Ambon.

It is the largest species of the genus Cephonodes. The upperside of the head, thorax, abdomen and wing bases is black. The underside of the thorax is orange, while the underside of the wing bases and abdomen is black. The anal tuft is brownish-orange.
