= Cephonodes santome =

Scientific classification
- Domain: Eukaryota
- Kingdom: Animalia
- Phylum: Arthropoda
- Class: Insecta
- Order: Lepidoptera
- Family: Sphingidae
- Genus: Cephonodes
- Species: C. santome

Binomial name
- Cephonodes santome Pierre, 2002

Species of moth

Cephonodes santome is a moth species of the family Sphingidae. It is known from São Tomé Island.
