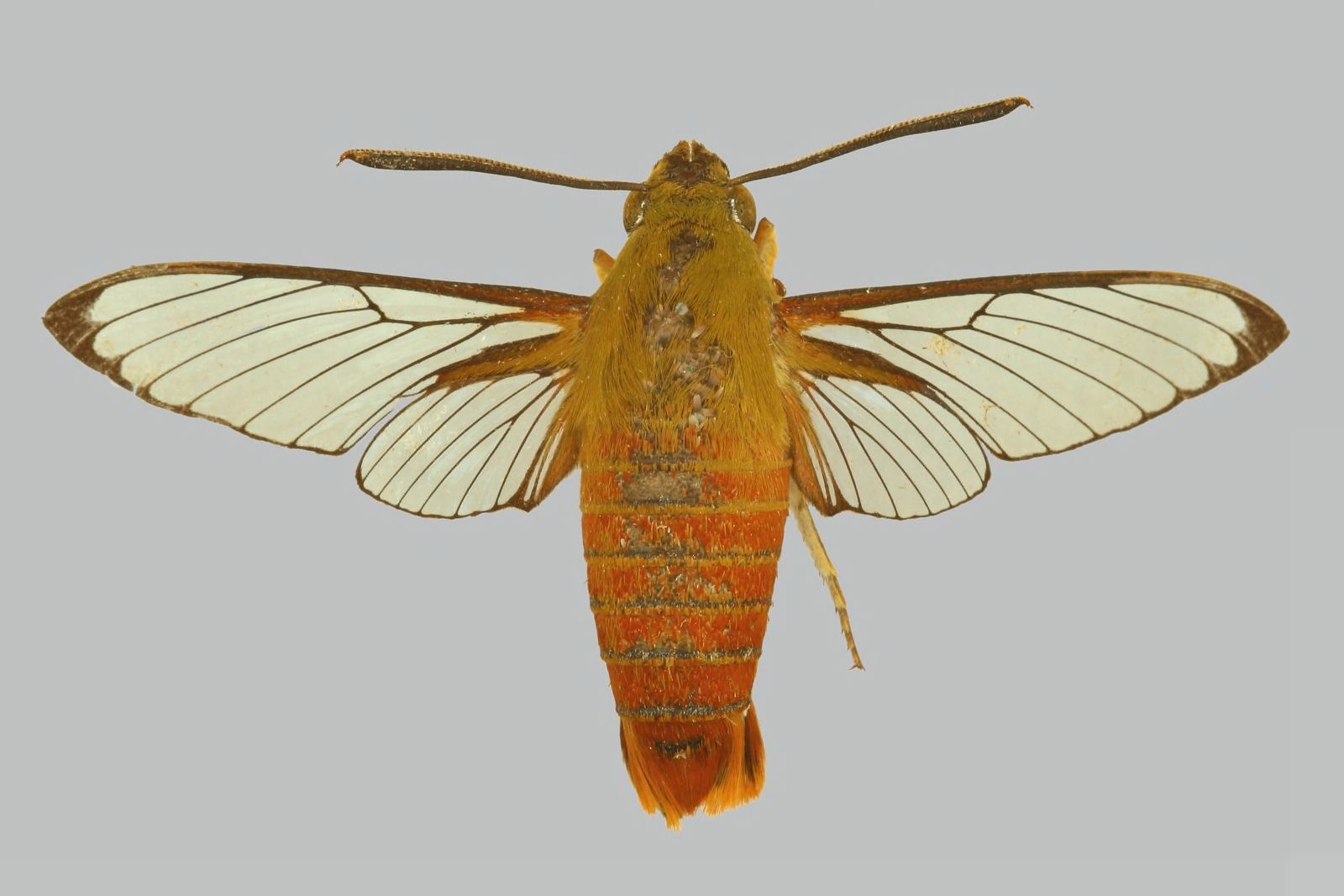
- Male

Scientific classification
- Kingdom: Animalia
- Phylum: Arthropoda
- Class: Insecta
- Order: Lepidoptera
- Family: Sphingidae
- Genus: Cephonodes
- Species: C. tamsi

Binomial name
- Cephonodes tamsi Griveaud, 1960

= Cephonodes tamsi =

Species of moth

Cephonodes tamsi also known as the Seychelles bee-hawkmoth is a moth of the family Sphingidae. It is known from the Seychelles.
