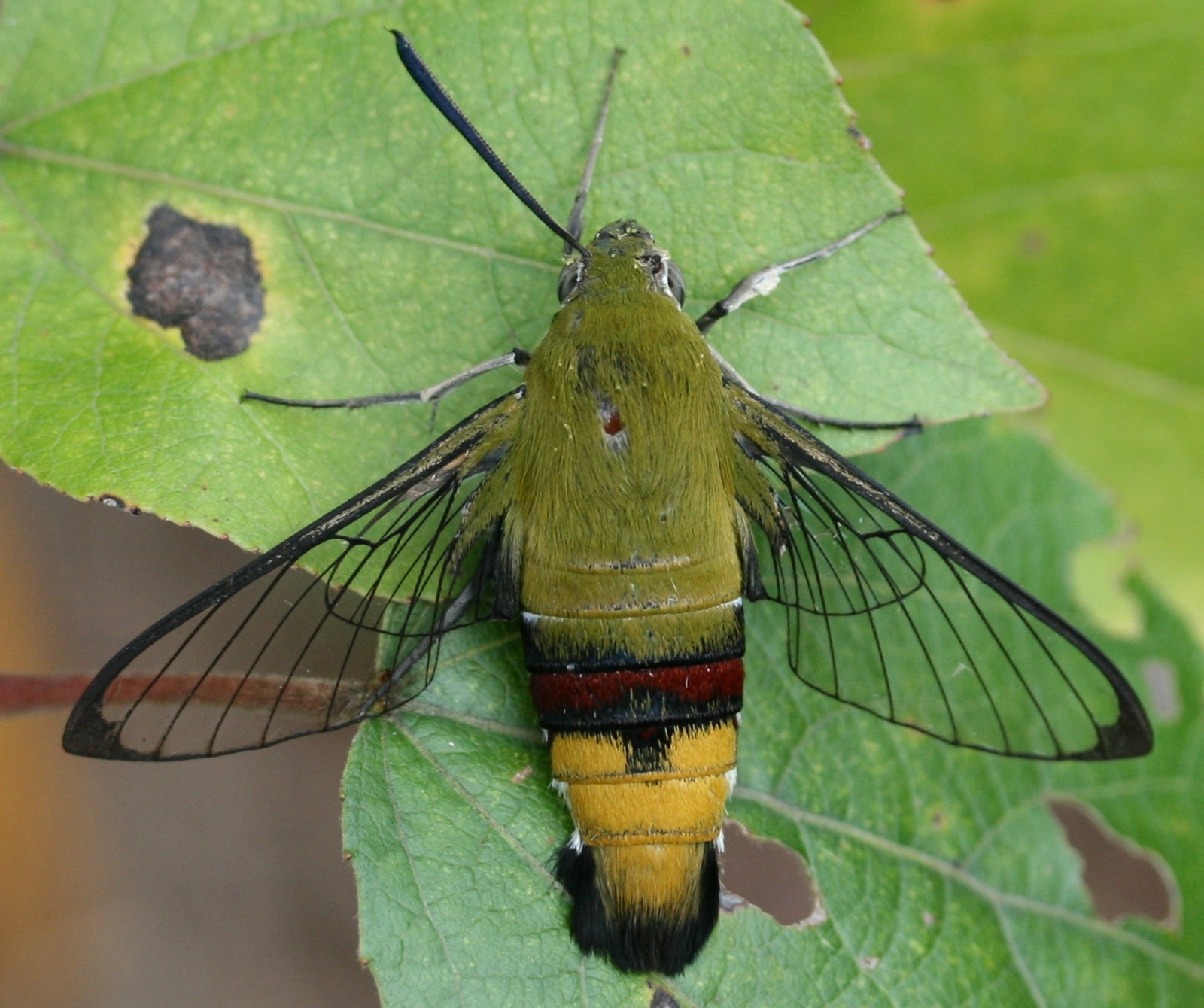

Scientific classification
- Kingdom: Animalia
- Phylum: Arthropoda
- Class: Insecta
- Order: Lepidoptera
- Family: Sphingidae
- Genus: Cephonodes
- Species: C. hylas

Binomial name
- Cephonodes hylas (Linnaeus, [1771])

Synonyms
- Sphinx hylas Linnaeus, [1771]

= Cephonodes hylas =

Species of moth

Cephonodes hylas, or the coffee bee hawkmoth, pellucid hawk moth or coffee clearwing, is a moth of the family Sphingidae. The species was first described by Carl Linnaeus in 1771. A widely distributed moth, it is found in the Near East, Middle East, Africa, India, Sri Lanka, Japan, Southeast Asia and Australia.

== Description ==
It has transparent wings and a stout body like a bumblebee. Its wingspan ranges between 45 and 73 mm. Its marginal borders are very narrow and black. The abdomen varies in colour from yellow to green. Nominate subspecies have bright reddish 3rd and 4th abdominal segments. The larva have two color forms, green and dark. In the green-colored form, the body is greenish with a white-bordered blue dorsal line and a whitish sub-dorsal line ending in a yellow streak at the base of the horn. The head and spiracles are blue. In the dark-colored form, the head is brown or pale orange and the rest of the body is smoky black. The pupa is dark brown.

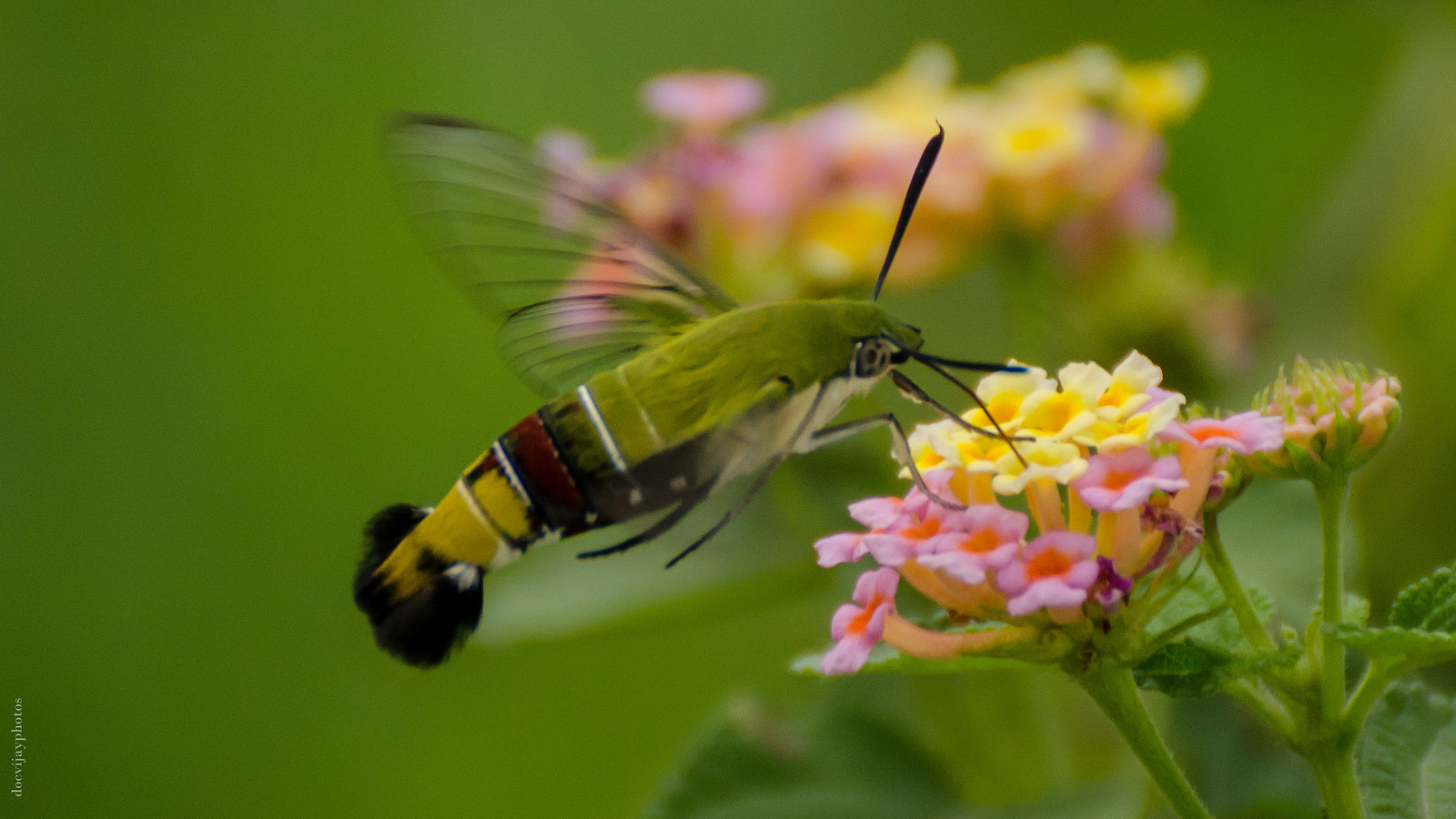
Pellucid hawk moth with clear wings, hovering and sucking nectar from flowers using proboscis, Hyderabad, India.

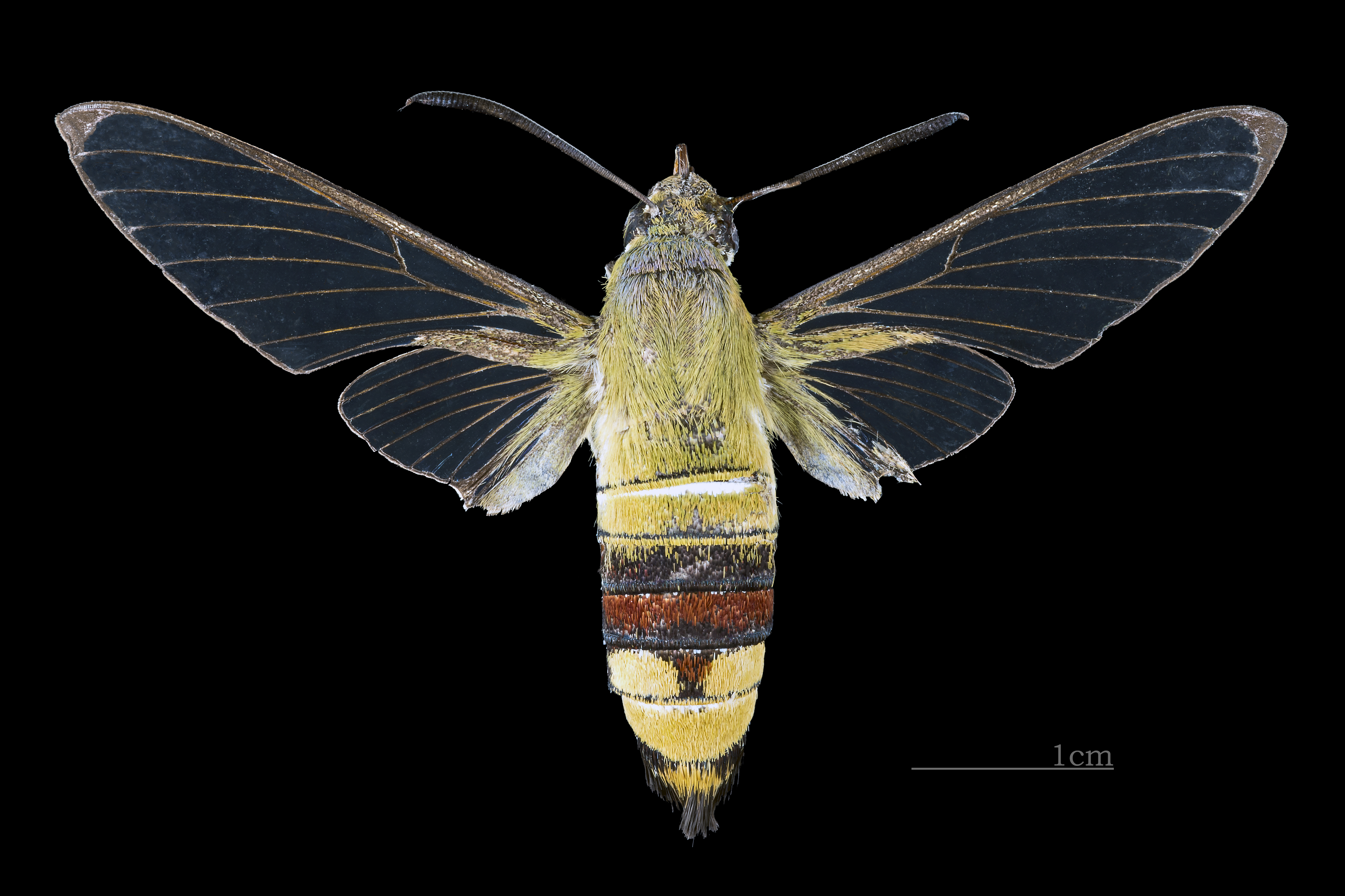
Dorsal male
(from the collection of the MHNT)

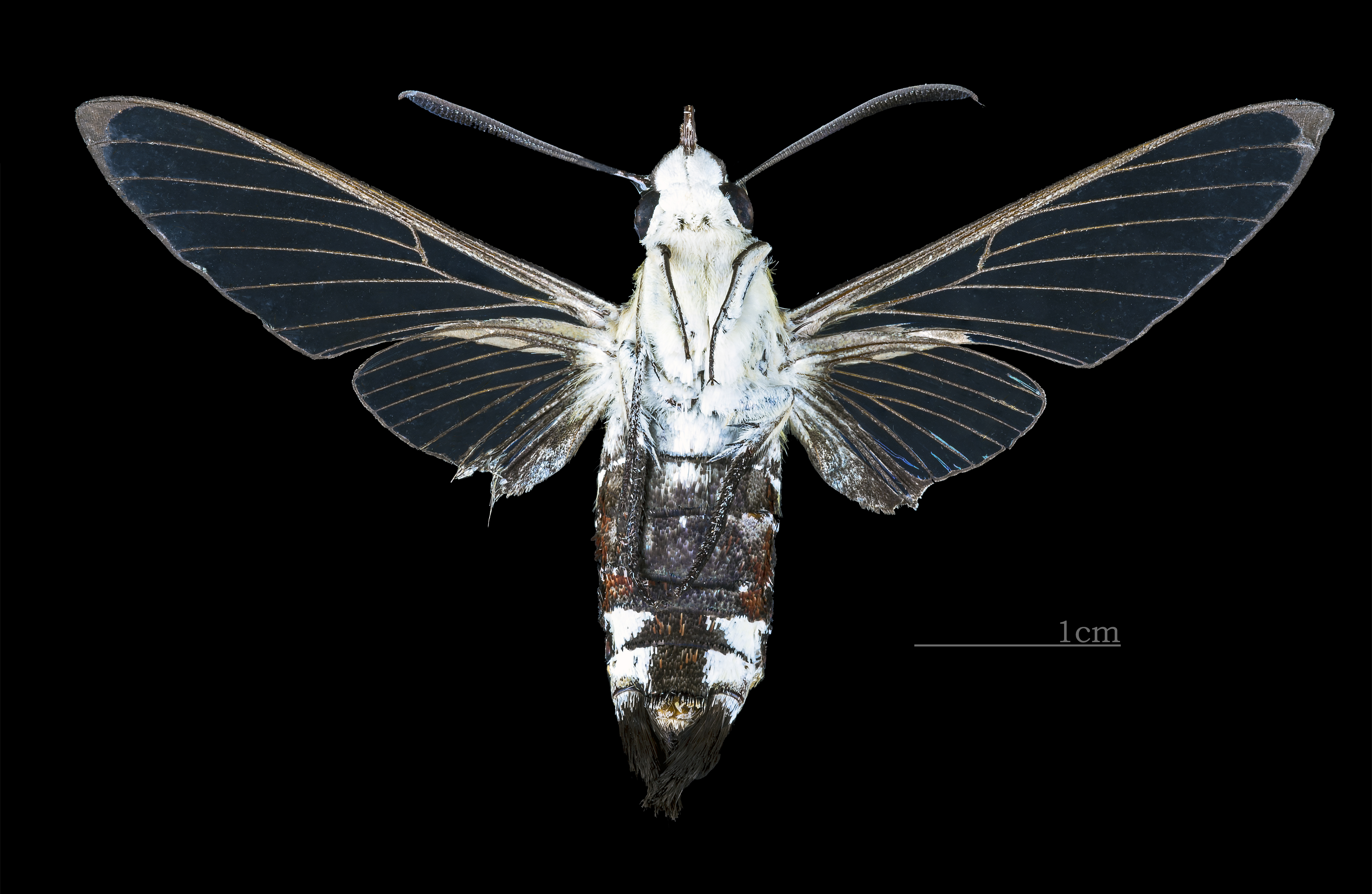
Ventral male
(coll. MHNT)

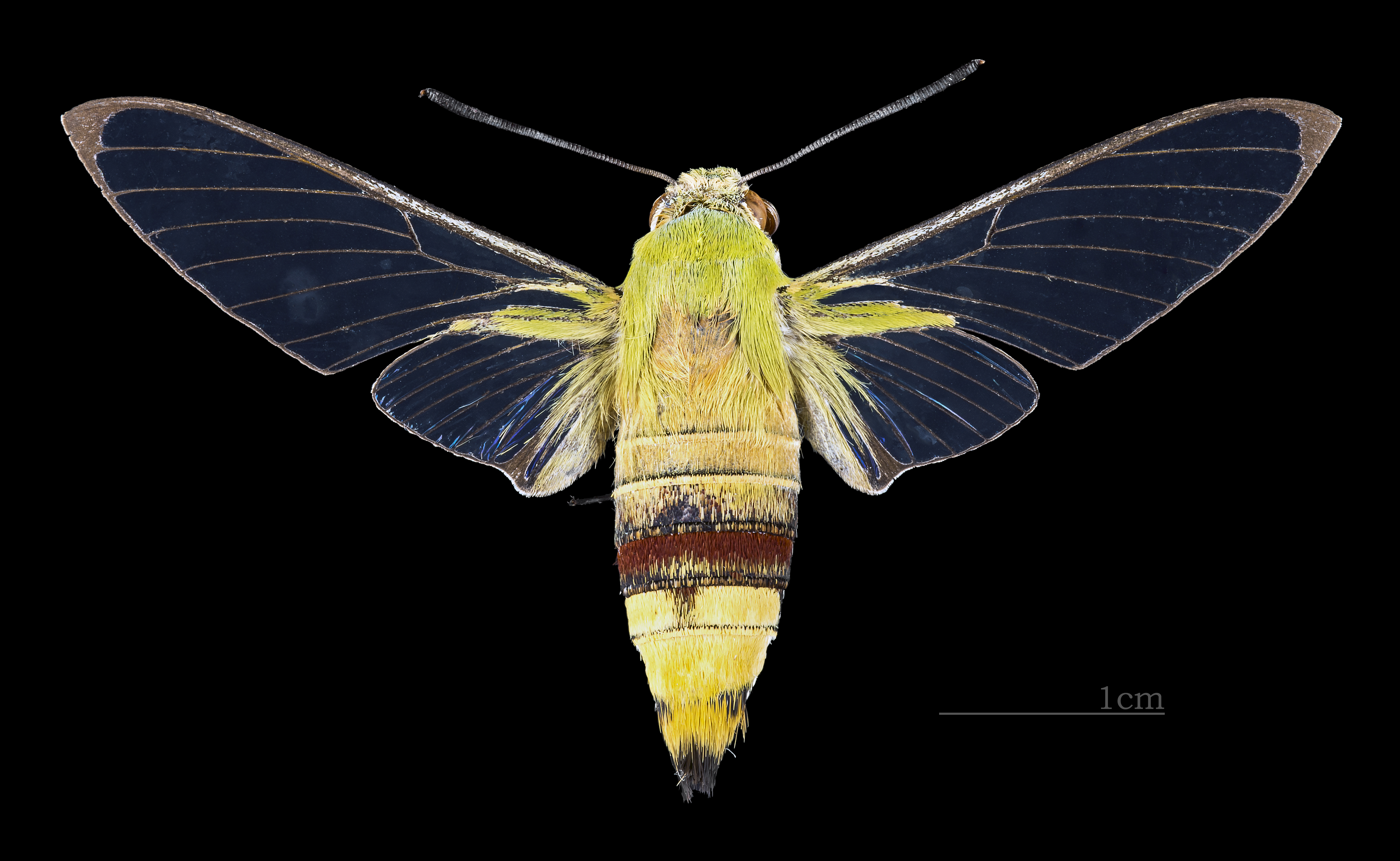
Dorsal female
(coll. MHNT)

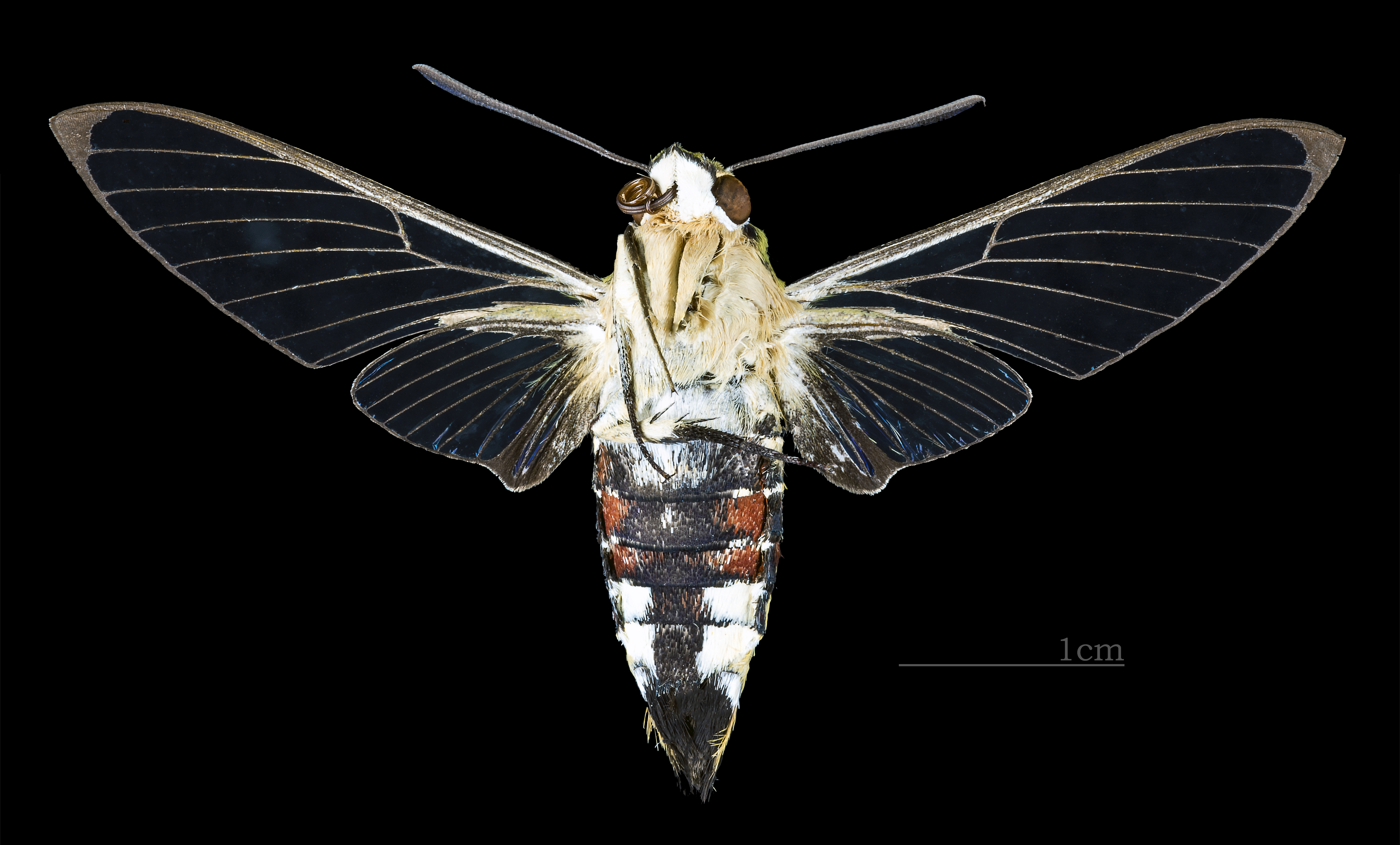
Ventral female
(coll. MHNT)

== Ecology ==
Larvae are sluggish but eat greedily and continuously. Its larvae feed on Burchellia, Gardenia, Kraussia, Pavetta and Vangueria species. Parasitoids such as Ooencyrtus papilionis and Blepharipa zebrine can be found on larva.

== Subspecies ==
- Cephonodes hylas hylas - (Linnaeus 1771) (Sri Lanka to China and Japan)
- Cephonodes hylas australis - Kitching & Cadiou, 2000 (Australia)
- Cephonodes hylas melanogaster - Cadiou, 1998 (Indonesia)
- Cephonodes hylas virescens - (Wallengren, 1865) (Ethiopian Region including Madagascar and the Seychelles)
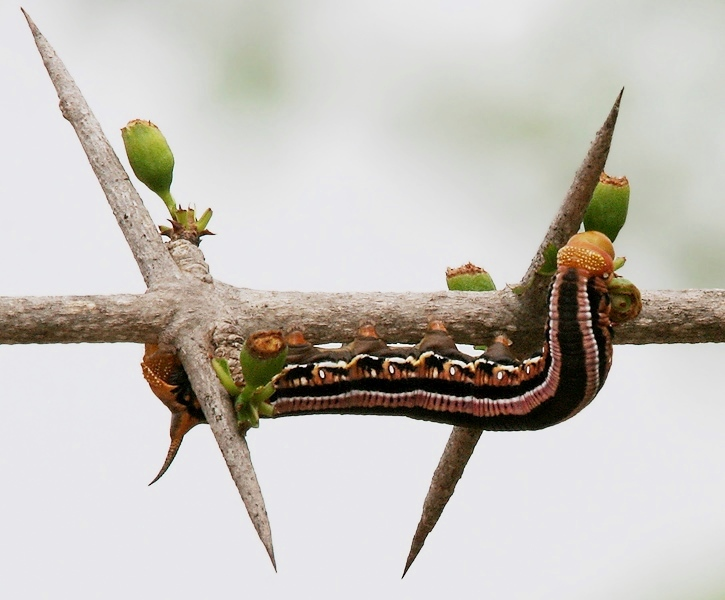
Cephonodes hylas larvae on Catunaregam spinosa in Hyderabad, India

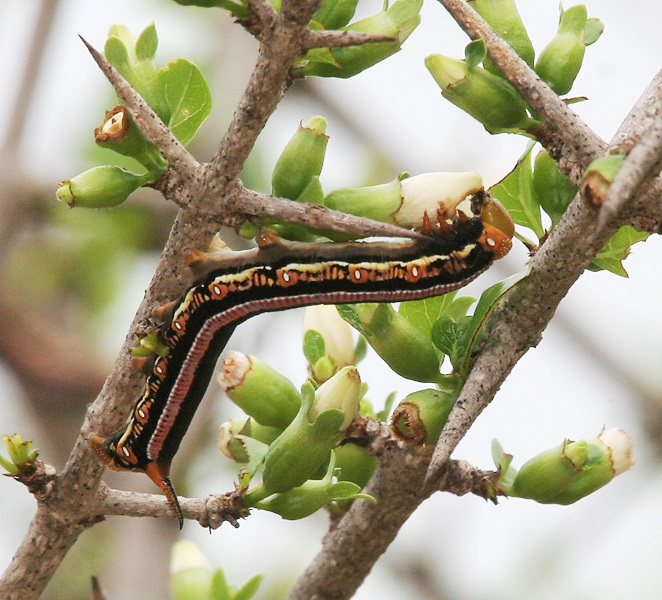
Cephonodes hylas larvae on Catunaregam spinosa in Hyderabad

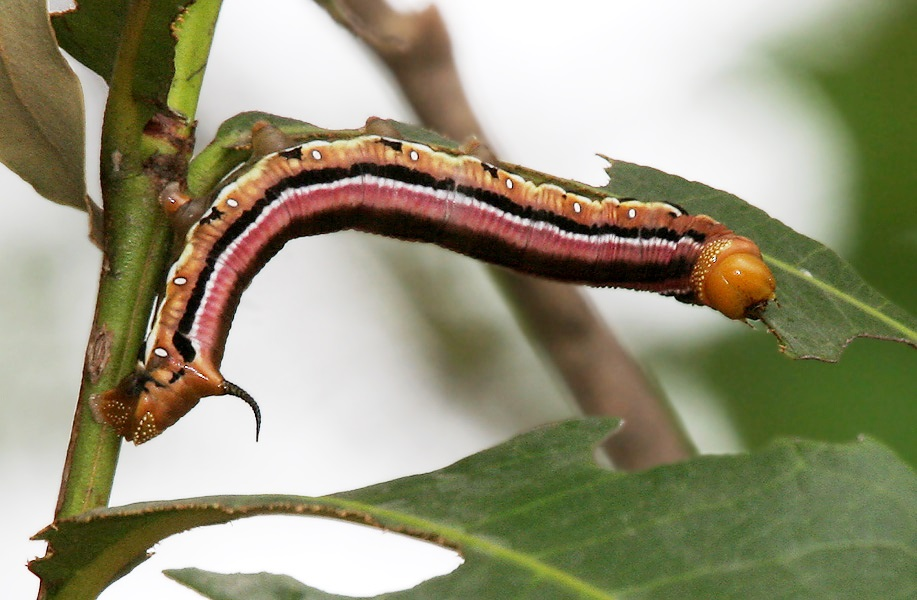
Cephonodes hylas larvae on Catunaregam spinosa in Hyderabad

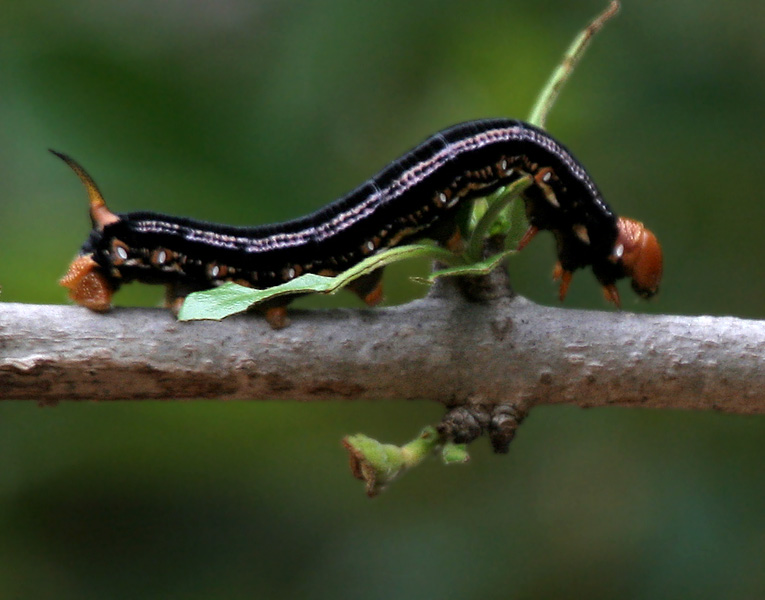
Cephonodes hylas larvae on Catunaregam spinosa in Hyderabad

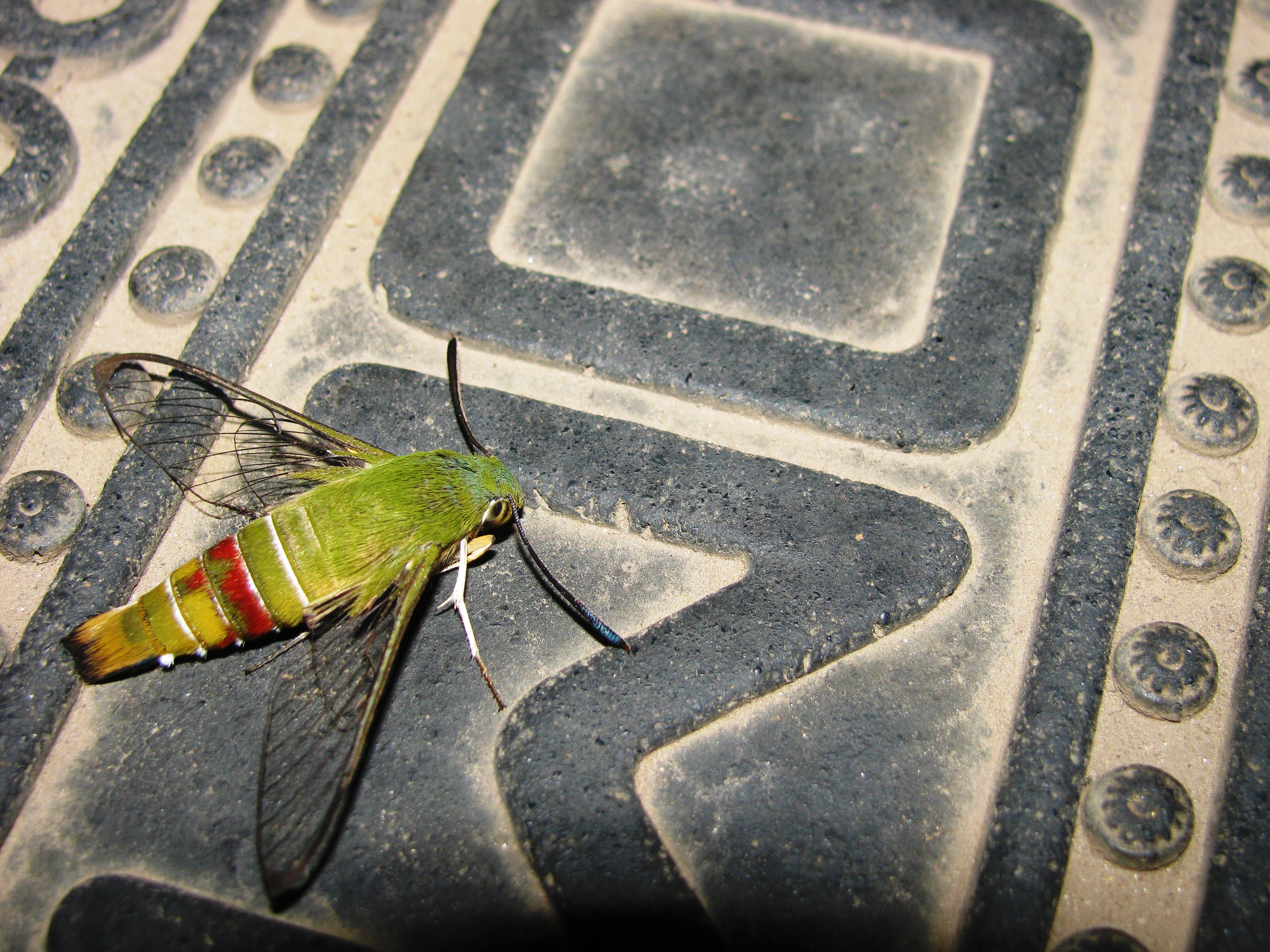
Pellucid hawk moth in Bangalore, India
