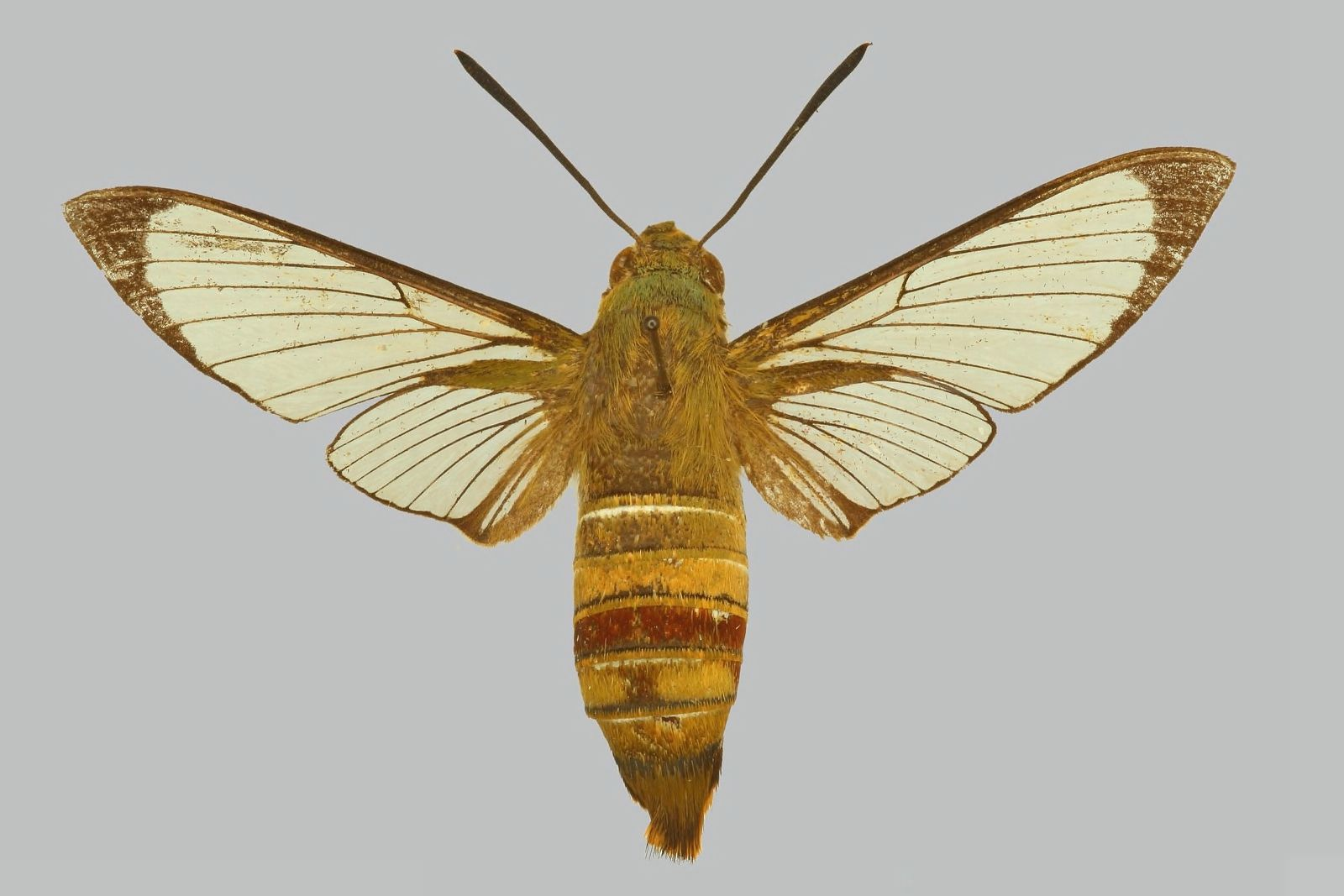

Scientific classification
- Domain: Eukaryota
- Kingdom: Animalia
- Phylum: Arthropoda
- Class: Insecta
- Order: Lepidoptera
- Family: Sphingidae
- Genus: Cephonodes
- Species: C. lifuensis

Binomial name
- Cephonodes lifuensis Rothschild, 1894

= Cephonodes lifuensis =

Species of moth

Cephonodes lifuensis is a moth of the family Sphingidae. It is known from New Caledonia.
