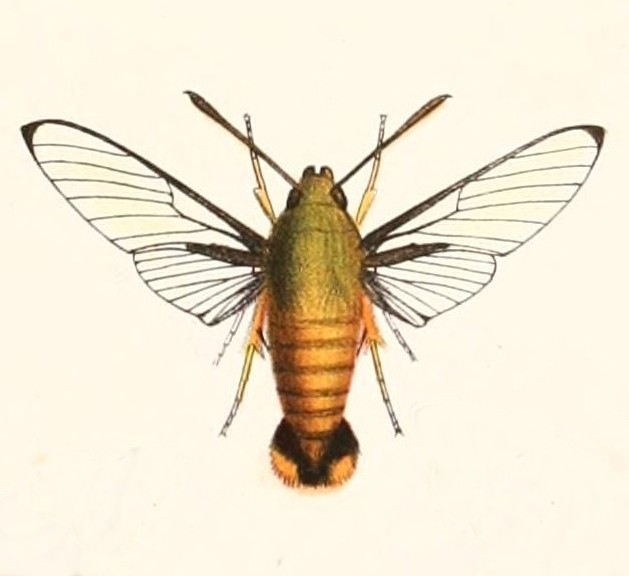
- Cephonodes janus simplex

Scientific classification
- Domain: Eukaryota
- Kingdom: Animalia
- Phylum: Arthropoda
- Class: Insecta
- Order: Lepidoptera
- Family: Sphingidae
- Genus: Cephonodes
- Species: C. janus

Binomial name
- Cephonodes janus Miskin, 1891

Synonyms
- Cephonodes unicolor Rothschild, 1896; Macroglossa cunninghami Schaufuss, 1870

= Cephonodes janus =

Species of moth

Cephonodes janus is a moth of the family Sphingidae first described by William Henry Miskin in 1891. It is known from the Australian state of Queensland, Flores in Indonesia, and New Caledonia east of Australia.

== Subspecies ==
- Cephonodes janus janus (Queensland)
- Cephonodes janus austrosundanus Rothschild & Jordan, 1903 (Flores)
- Cephonodes janus simplex Rothschild, 1894 (New Caledonia)
