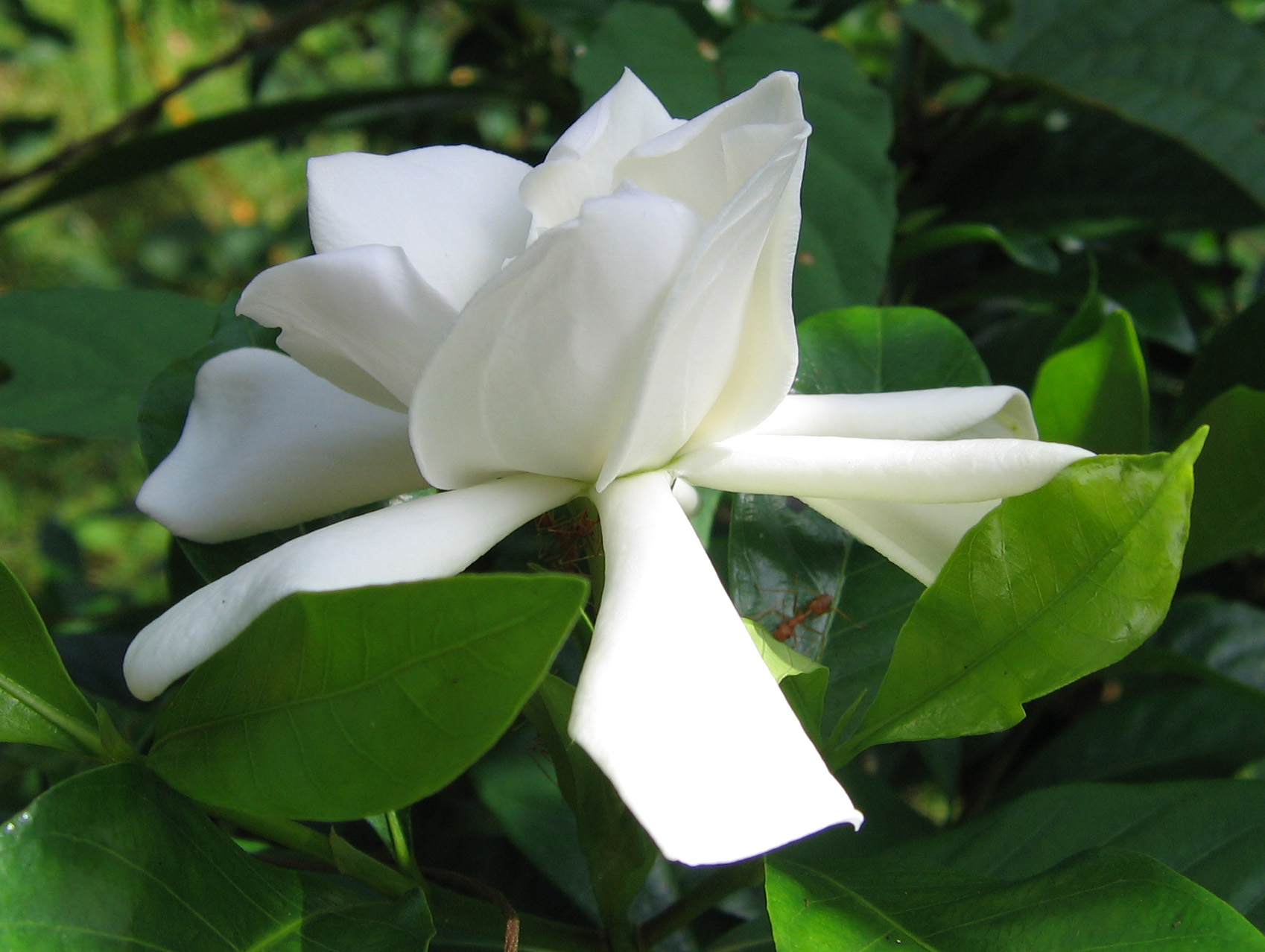

Conservation status
- Least Concern (IUCN 2.3)

Scientific classification
- Kingdom: Plantae
- Clade: Embryophytes
- Clade: Tracheophytes
- Clade: Angiosperms
- Clade: Eudicots
- Clade: Asterids
- Order: Gentianales
- Family: Rubiaceae
- Genus: Gardenia
- Species: G. gummifera

Binomial name
- Gardenia gummifera L.f.

Synonyms
- Genipa arborea (Roxb.) Baill. Genipa gummifera (L.f.) Baill.

= Gardenia gummifera =

Species of plant

Gardenia gummifera is a species of plant in the family Rubiaceae. It is endemic to India.
