= Gardenia candida =

Conservation status
- Critically Endangered (IUCN 3.1)

Scientific classification
- Kingdom: Plantae
- Clade: Tracheophytes
- Clade: Angiosperms
- Clade: Eudicots
- Clade: Asterids
- Order: Gentianales
- Family: Rubiaceae
- Genus: Gardenia
- Species: G. candida

Binomial name
- Gardenia candida A.C.Sm.

Species of plant

Gardenia candida is a species of asterid flowering plant in the family Rubiaceae. This species is endemic to Fiji, where it is known from the Seanggangga Plateau on Vanua Levu. Native gardenias of the Fiji Islands and elsewhere in the paleotropics possess a diverse array of natural products. Methoxylated and oxygenated flavonols and triterpenes accumulate on the vegetative- and floral-buds as yellow to brown droplets of secreted resin. Focused phytochemical studies of these bud exudates have been published, including a population-level study of another rare, sympatric species, G. grievei.

The species was described by Albert Charles Smith in 1953.
