= Gardenia gordonii =

Conservation status
- Least Concern (IUCN 3.1)

Scientific classification
- Kingdom: Plantae
- Clade: Tracheophytes
- Clade: Angiosperms
- Clade: Eudicots
- Clade: Asterids
- Order: Gentianales
- Family: Rubiaceae
- Genus: Gardenia
- Species: G. gordonii

Binomial name
- Gardenia gordonii Baker

Synonyms
- Gardenia gorriei Horne ex Baker

Species of plant

Gardenia gordonii is a species of flowering plant in the family Rubiaceae. It is a shrub or tree endemic to Viti Levu and Vanua Levu in Fiji. The native gardenias of Fiji possess a diverse array of natural products. Methoxylated and oxygenated flavonols and triterpenes accumulate on the vegetative- and floral-buds as droplets of secreted resin. Phytochemical studies of these bud exudates have been published, including a population-level study of two other rare, sympatric species on Vanua Levu Island of the Fiji Archipelago, G. candida and G. grievei.

The species was described by John Gilbert Baker in 1883.
