= Gardenia transvenulosa =

Conservation status
- Least Concern (IUCN 3.1)

Scientific classification
- Kingdom: Plantae
- Clade: Tracheophytes
- Clade: Angiosperms
- Clade: Eudicots
- Clade: Asterids
- Order: Gentianales
- Family: Rubiaceae
- Genus: Gardenia
- Species: G. transvenulosa

Binomial name
- Gardenia transvenulosa Verdc.

Species of plant

Gardenia transvenulosa is a species of plant in the family Rubiaceae. It is found in Kenya and Tanzania.
