= Gardenia hillii =

Conservation status
- Vulnerable (IUCN 2.3)

Scientific classification
- Kingdom: Plantae
- Clade: Tracheophytes
- Clade: Angiosperms
- Clade: Eudicots
- Clade: Asterids
- Order: Gentianales
- Family: Rubiaceae
- Genus: Gardenia
- Species: G. hillii

Binomial name
- Gardenia hillii Horne ex Baker

Species of plant

Gardenia hillii is a species of plant in the family Rubiaceae. It is endemic to Fiji.
