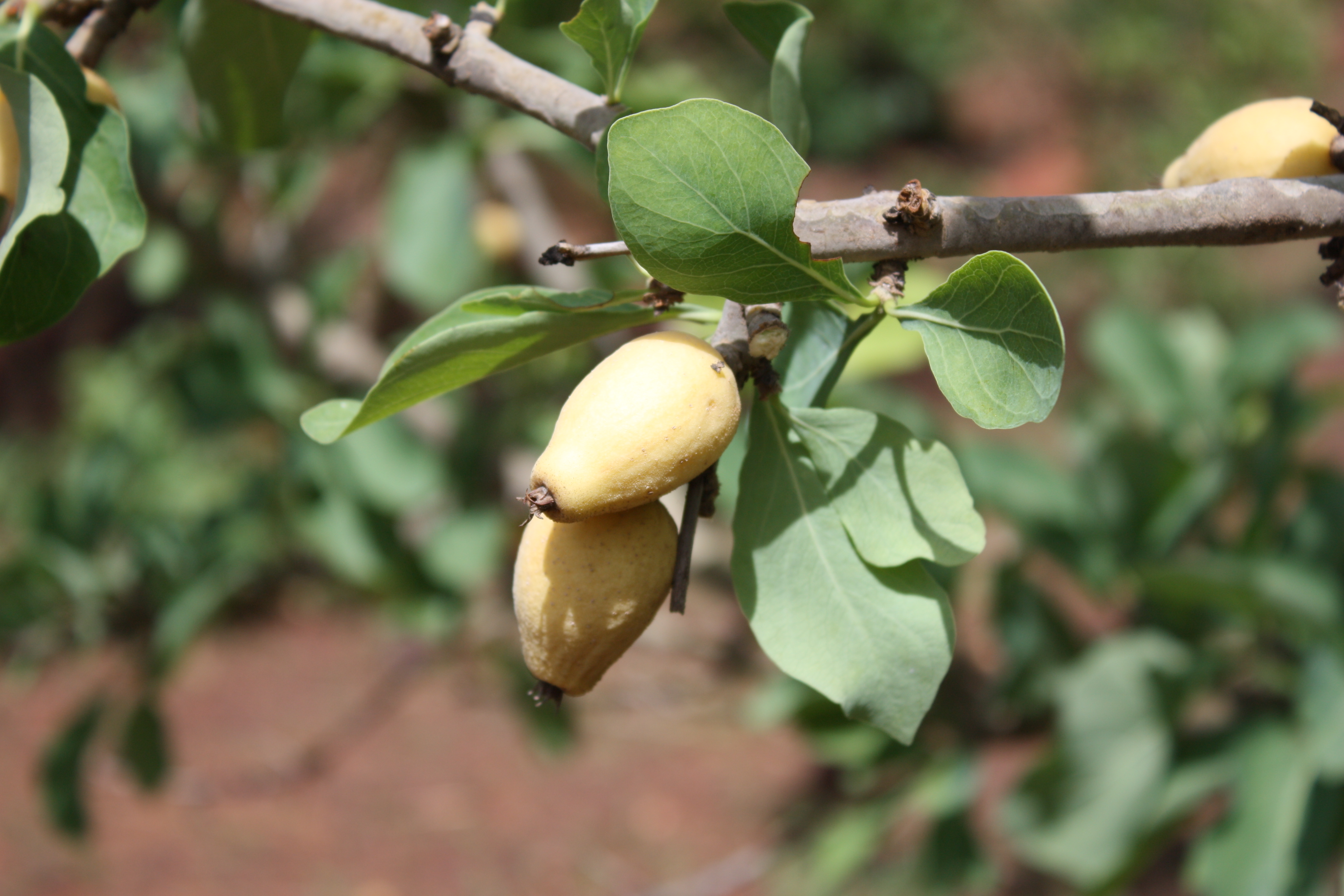

Conservation status
- Least Concern (IUCN 3.1)

Scientific classification
- Kingdom: Plantae
- Clade: Tracheophytes
- Clade: Angiosperms
- Clade: Eudicots
- Clade: Asterids
- Order: Gentianales
- Family: Rubiaceae
- Genus: Gardenia
- Species: G. erubescens

Binomial name
- Gardenia erubescens Stapf & Hutch.

Synonyms
- Gardenia triacantha var. parvilimbis F.N.Williams

= Gardenia erubescens =

Species of plant

Gardenia erubescens is a species of shrub or small tree in the family Rubiaceae. It has edible fruits and occurs in the Guinea and Sudan savannah vegetation of West and Central Africa.

== Description ==
A shrub or small tree, the species grows to 3 meters in height. Leaves are opposite, grows on the end of short branches and grouped in tufts, when dry, the foliage have a purple greyish color on the upper surface which becomes a little duller beneath, both sides are glabrous. Stipules are 2–4 mm long, leaf-blade is broadly obovate. Inflorescence; flowers are solitary or in small clusters, calyx is tubular consisting of 6 linear lobes, corolla, also is in a tubular form, consisting of about 6 elliptic lobes. Fruit has an ellipsoid or ovoid shape, it is yellowish in color when ripe, about 3–8 cm long.

== Distribution ==
Commonly occurs in woodland savannas in West African countries of Senegal, Nigeria, and eastwards towards Central Africa.

== Chemistry ==
Test on plant extracts identified the presence of the compounds beta-sitosterol, oleanolic acid, ursolic acid and a group of methylated flavonoids that includes 5-hydroxy-7,4'-dimethoxyflavone and triterpenoids.

== Uses ==
In parts of Northern Nigeria, a decoction of the species is used to treat a variety of health issues including gonorrhea, ascites and loss of appetite, extracts are also used as an aphrodisiac and stimulant. Its edible fruit are consumed by locals.
