= Gardenia hutchinsoniana =

Conservation status
- Least Concern (IUCN 2.3)

Scientific classification
- Kingdom: Plantae
- Clade: Embryophytes
- Clade: Tracheophytes
- Clade: Angiosperms
- Clade: Eudicots
- Clade: Asterids
- Order: Gentianales
- Family: Rubiaceae
- Genus: Gardenia
- Species: G. hutchinsoniana

Binomial name
- Gardenia hutchinsoniana Turrill

Species of plant

Gardenia hutchinsoniana is a species of flowering plant in the family Rubiaceae. It is a shrub or tree endemic to Fiji.
