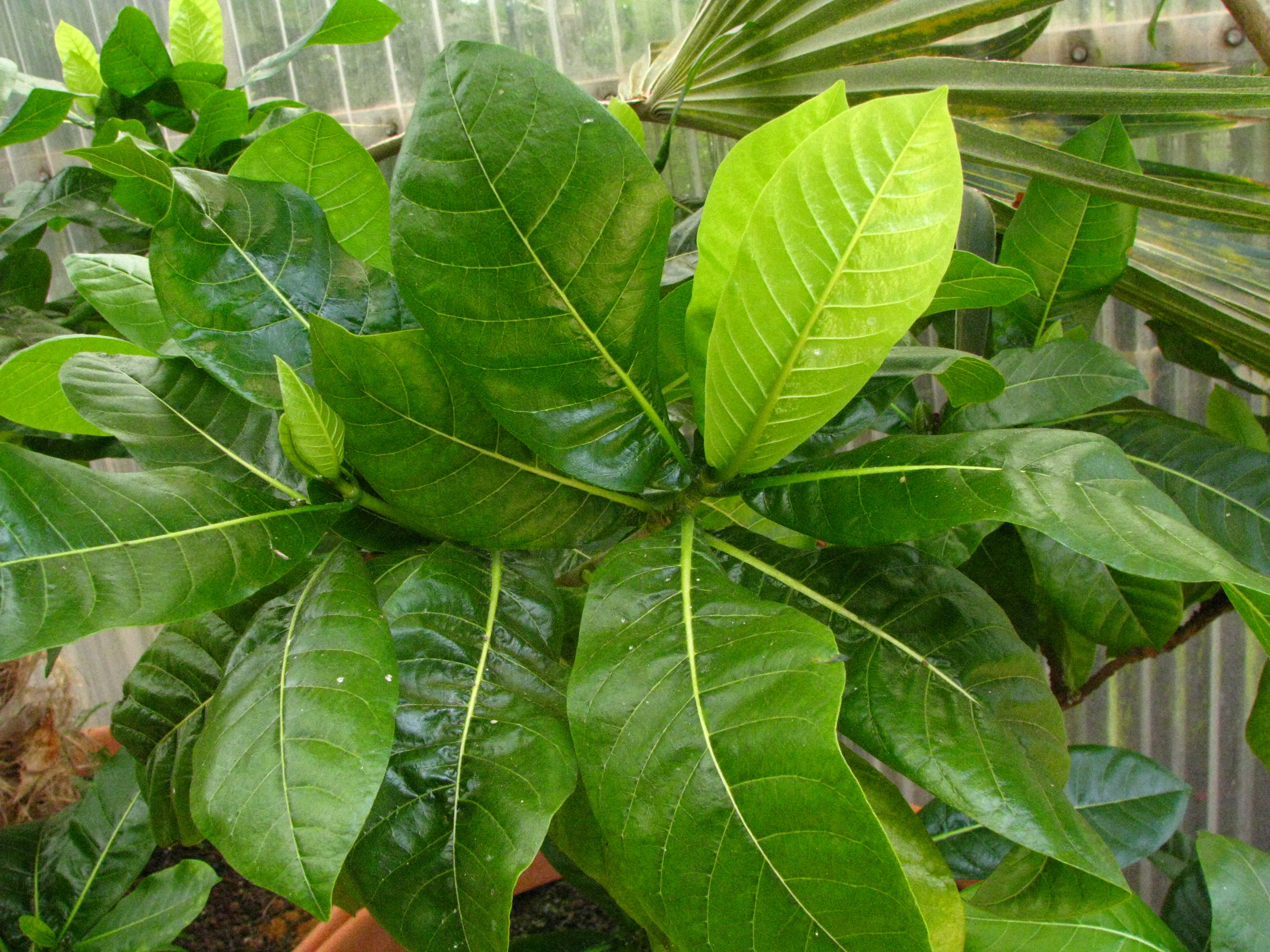

Conservation status
- Critically Endangered (IUCN 3.1)

Scientific classification
- Kingdom: Plantae
- Clade: Tracheophytes
- Clade: Angiosperms
- Clade: Eudicots
- Clade: Asterids
- Order: Gentianales
- Family: Rubiaceae
- Genus: Gardenia
- Species: G. remyi

Binomial name
- Gardenia remyi H.Mann

= Gardenia remyi =

Remy's gardenia

Species of plant

Gardenia remyi is a species of flowering tree in the madder family, Rubiaceae. It is sometimes referred to by the common names nānū or Remy's gardenia, and is endemic to Hawaiʻi. It inhabits coastal mesic, mixed mesic, and wet forests at elevations of 60–760 m (200–2,490 ft) on Kauaʻi, Molokaʻi, Maui, and the Big Island.

It is threatened by habitat loss.
