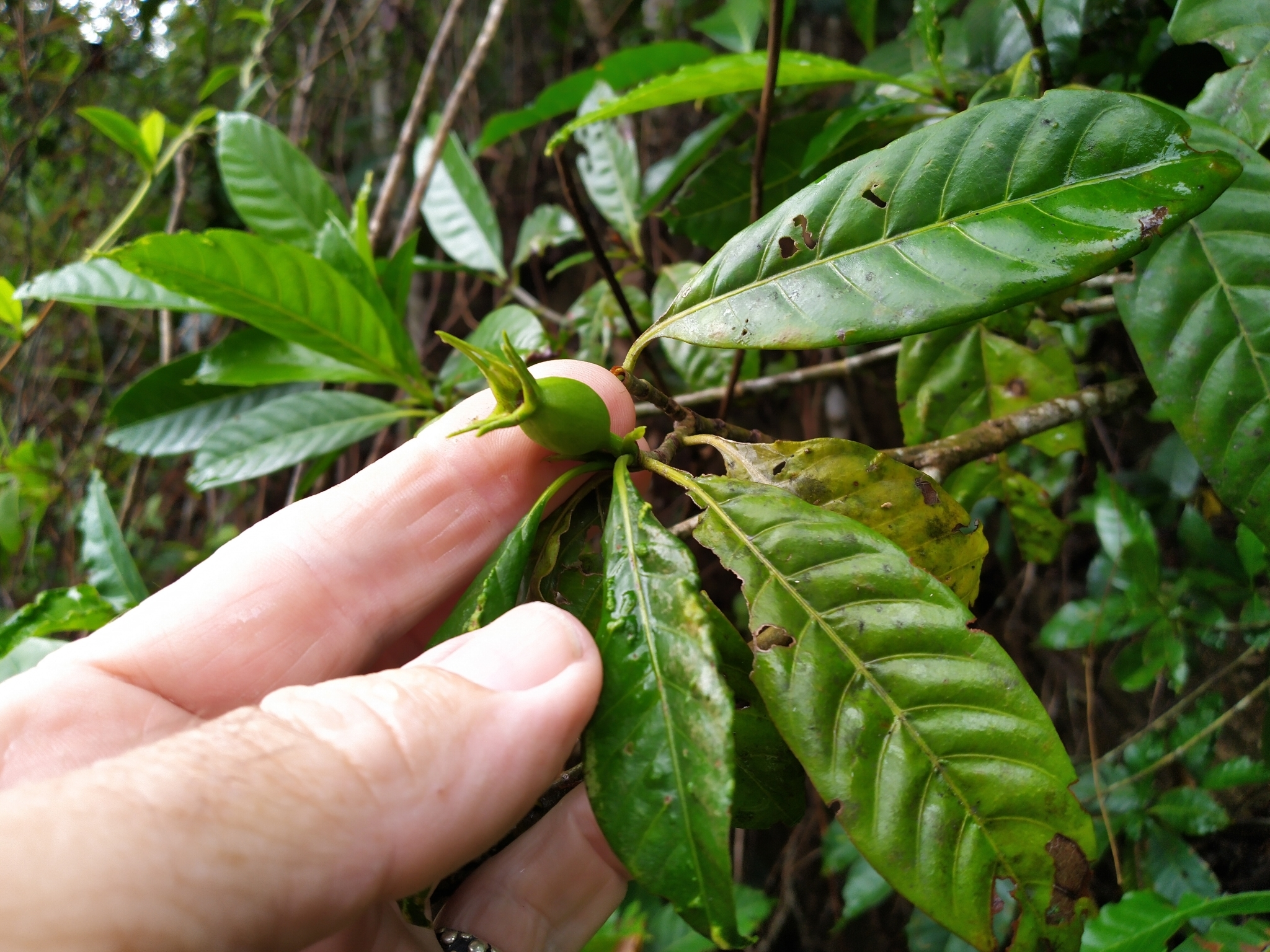
- Developing fruit

Conservation status
- Least Concern (NCA)

Scientific classification
- Kingdom: Plantae
- Clade: Embryophytes
- Clade: Tracheophytes
- Clade: Angiosperms
- Clade: Eudicots
- Clade: Asterids
- Order: Gentianales
- Family: Rubiaceae
- Genus: Gardenia
- Species: G. ovularis

Binomial name
- Gardenia ovularis F.M.Bailey

= Gardenia ovularis =

Native gardenia

Species of flowering plant

Gardenia ovularis is a small tree in the family Rubiaceae. It is endemic to a very restricted part of north east Queensland, namely the coastal rainforests from the Bloomfield River southwards to Etty Bay, and with a further isolated occurrence at Mount Elliot, south of Townsville It was first described by Frederick Manson Bailey in 1893.

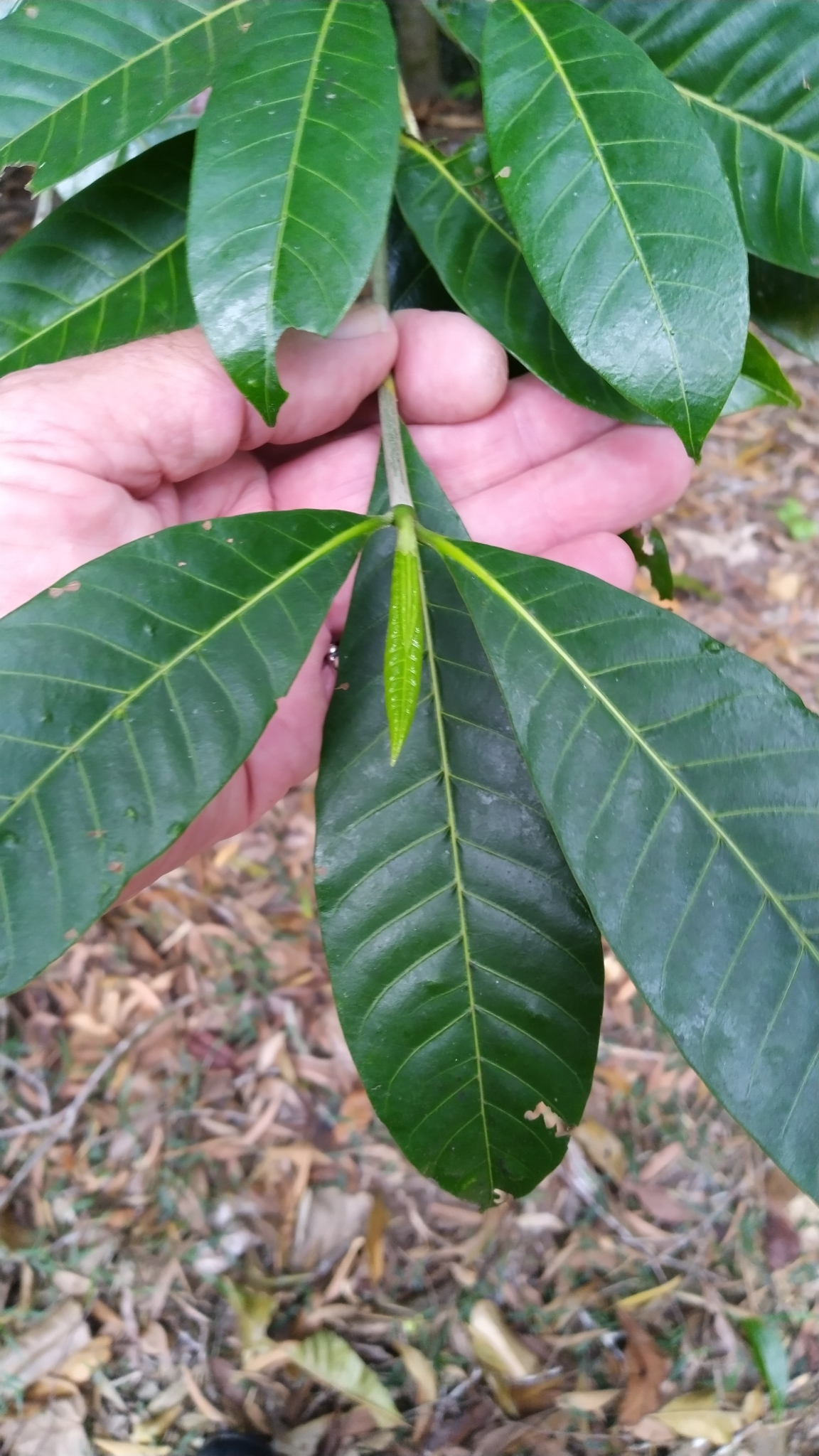

== Conservation ==
This species is listed by the Queensland Department of Environment and Science as least concern. As of 10 November 2022, it has not been assessed by the IUCN.
