= Gardenia anapetes =

Conservation status
- Endangered (IUCN 3.1)

Scientific classification
- Kingdom: Plantae
- Clade: Tracheophytes
- Clade: Angiosperms
- Clade: Eudicots
- Clade: Asterids
- Order: Gentianales
- Family: Rubiaceae
- Genus: Gardenia
- Species: G. anapetes

Binomial name
- Gardenia anapetes A.C. Smith

Species of plant

Gardenia anapetes is a species of plant in the family Rubiaceae. It is endemic to the Fiji island of Vanua Levu. The native gardenias of Fiji possess a diverse array of natural products. Methoxylated and oxygenated flavonols and triterpenes accumulate on the vegetative- and floral-buds as droplets of secreted resin. Phytochemical studies of these bud exudates have been published, including a population-level study of two other rare, sympatric species on Vanua Levu Island, G. candida and G. grievei.
