= Gardenia storckii =

Conservation status
- Least Concern (IUCN 3.1)

Scientific classification
- Kingdom: Plantae
- Clade: Tracheophytes
- Clade: Angiosperms
- Clade: Eudicots
- Clade: Asterids
- Order: Gentianales
- Family: Rubiaceae
- Genus: Gardenia
- Species: G. storckii

Binomial name
- Gardenia storckii Oliv.

Species of plant

Gardenia storckii, locally known as Mbolovatu or Ndrenga, is a species of flowering plant in the family Rubiaceae in Fiji. It is and the only gardenia occurring abundantly in the forested area of Serua Province in southeastern Viti Levu, to which its range is confined. It has been noted in dense, dry, or secondary forest as a slender tree 2–15 m high and with a trunk to 14 cm in diameter. Flowers have been obtained in January through March, and fruits between April and November. It produces an abundance of latex. The resiniferous buds are used for chewing, and an extract of the roots is used medicinally for constipation.
