= Gardenia grievei =

Conservation status
- Endangered (IUCN 3.1)

Scientific classification
- Kingdom: Plantae
- Clade: Tracheophytes
- Clade: Angiosperms
- Clade: Eudicots
- Clade: Asterids
- Order: Gentianales
- Family: Rubiaceae
- Genus: Gardenia
- Species: G. grievei

Binomial name
- Gardenia grievei Horne ex Baker

Species of plant

Gardenia grievei is a species of asterid flowering plant in the family Rubiaceae. This species, among others, is endemic to Fiji with populations known from Vanua Levu and Viti Levu islands. Native gardenias of the Fiji Islands and elsewhere in the paleotropics possess a diverse array of natural products including methoxylated and oxygenated flavonols and triterpenes. These secondary plant substances accumulate on the vegetative- and floral-buds as yellow to brown droplets of secreted resin. Focused phytochemical studies of these bud exudates have been published, including a population-level study of a sympatric species, G. candida
