= Gardenia imperialis =

Scientific classification
- Kingdom: Plantae
- Clade: Embryophytes
- Clade: Tracheophytes
- Clade: Angiosperms
- Clade: Eudicots
- Clade: Asterids
- Order: Gentianales
- Family: Rubiaceae
- Genus: Gardenia
- Species: G. imperialis

Binomial name
- Gardenia imperialis K.Schum.

Species of plant

Gardenia imperialis is a small to medium sized tree within the Rubiaceae family, it is found in swamp savannahs or forests in Tropical Africa.

== Description ==
The species grows up to 18 meters tall, trunk is greyish in color. Leaves have a simple, opposite arrangement, and are sometimes sticky, they are broadly obovate and large in outline; upper surface is glabrous while abaxial surface is sometimes velvety with ant's nesting cavity around the midrib; its leaf-blade is 15–38 cm long and 10–22 cm wide. White fragrant flowers, it has large narrow funnel shaped corolla tubes, the outer surface of the tubes is pinkish while the inner surface is whitish. Fruit is ovoid to ellipsoid in shape and reddish-brown in color.

== Distribution ==
The species occurs in Senegal in West Africa, eastwards to Uganda and Southwards towards Zimbabwe. Grows on the margins of streams and lakes, in swamp forests and riverine areas.

== Chemistry ==
Test on root bark extracts identified two triterpenoid compounds, 3-epi-β-amyrin and β-amyrin acetate.
