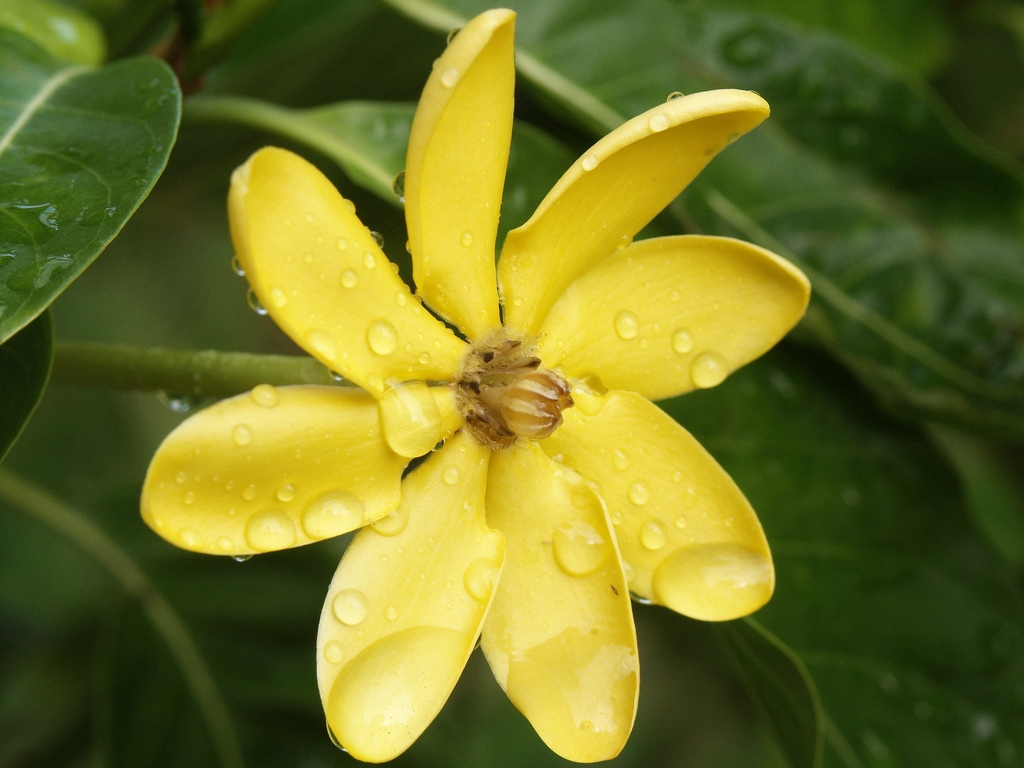
- Gardenia tubifera flower in bloom

Scientific classification
- Kingdom: Plantae
- Clade: Tracheophytes
- Clade: Angiosperms
- Clade: Eudicots
- Clade: Asterids
- Order: Gentianales
- Family: Rubiaceae
- Genus: Gardenia
- Species: G. tubifera

Binomial name
- Gardenia tubifera Wall.

= Gardenia tubifera =

Species of plant

Gardenia tubifera, also called golden gardenia, is a species of flowering small tree in the family Rubiaceae, native to Asia. It is a small tree, growing to a height of 2–4 m (6–12 ft) high with a spread of 1–2 m (3–6 ft). It prefers tropical conditions and will not tolerate temperatures below freezing.

== Varieties ==
- Gardenia tubifera var. kula
