= Gardenia ornata =

Scientific classification
- Kingdom: Plantae
- Clade: Tracheophytes
- Clade: Angiosperms
- Clade: Eudicots
- Clade: Asterids
- Order: Gentianales
- Family: Rubiaceae
- Genus: Gardenia
- Species: G. ornata

Binomial name
- Gardenia ornata K.M.Wong

Species of plant

Gardenia ornata is a species of plant in the family Rubiaceae native to the Philippines.
