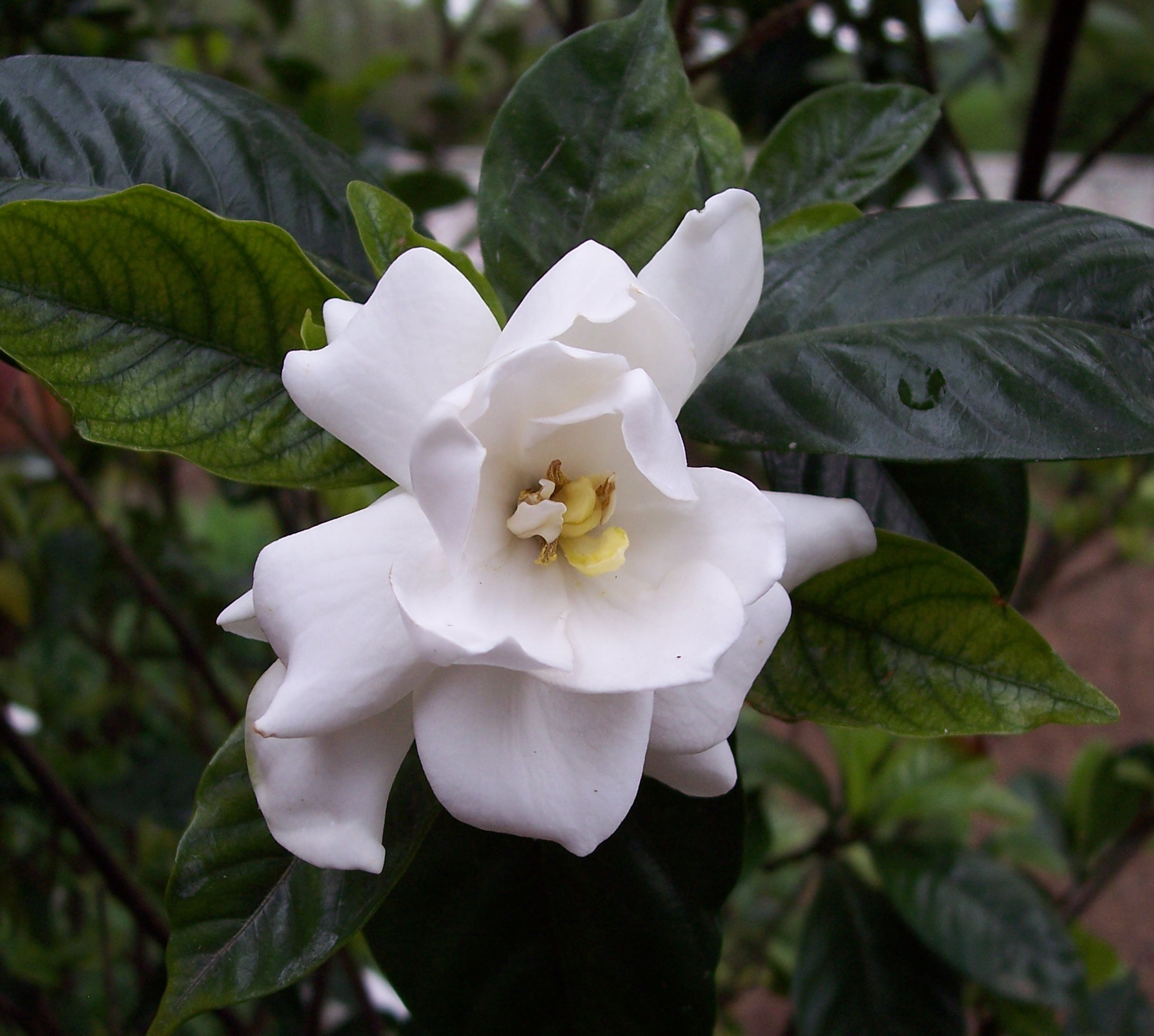
- Gardenia jasminoides

Scientific classification
- Kingdom: Plantae
- Clade: Embryophytes
- Clade: Tracheophytes
- Clade: Angiosperms
- Clade: Eudicots
- Clade: Asterids
- Order: Gentianales
- Family: Rubiaceae
- Subfamily: Ixoroideae
- Tribe: Gardenieae
- Genus: Gardenia; J.Ellis

Species
- See text.

= Gardenia =

Genus of flowering plants in the coffee family

Gardenia is a genus of flowering plants in the coffee family, Rubiaceae, native to the tropical and subtropical regions of Africa, Asia, Madagascar, Pacific Islands, and Australia.

The Gardenia genus was named by Carl Linnaeus (though the name was first proposed to him in 1753 by Jane Colden, who often goes uncredited) and John Ellis. The genus was named after Alexander Garden (1730–1791), a Scottish naturalist. The type species is Gardenia jasminoides, as first published by Ellis in 1761.

== Description ==
Gardenia species typically grow as shrubs or small trees, however some species, such as those native to New Guinea, may grow to 20–30 m (66–98 ft) tall. A small number of species found in tropical East Africa and southern Africa grow as small pyrophytic subshrubs. At least one species, Gardenia epiphytica, native to Gabon and Cameroon, grows as an epiphyte. Most species are unarmed and spineless, but some species such as some of those found in Africa are spinescent.

The leaf arrangement is typically opposite or verticillate may (arranged in whorls). Leaves vary by species; many species are glossy with a distinctly coriaceous (or leathery) texture such as that seen in Gardenia jasminoides, whilst in others, leaves may be thin and chartaceous (or paper-like).

The flowers, particularly in the species most commonly grown in gardens, may be large and showy and white, cream or pale yellow in color, with a pleasant and strong, sometimes overpowering scent that may be more noticeable at night, something quite typical of moth-pollinated plants.

Gardenia flowers are hermaphrodite (or bisexual) with each individual flower having both male and female structures (that is, having both stamens and carpels). The arrangement of the flowers on the plant are solitary or in small terminal clusters or fascicles. The flowers vary across species, but most commonly have a funnel- or cylindrical-shaped corolla tube, normally elongated and narrow distally, surrounded by 5–12 or more lobes (petals) contorted or arranged in an overlapping pattern.

== Phytochemistry ==
Crocetin is a chemical compound usually obtained from Crocus sativus, which can also be obtained from the fruit of Gardenia jasminoides. Gordonin is a novel methoxylated flavonol secreted in golden-colored resinous droplets of Gardenia gordonii, which is one of several critically endangered species of the Fiji Islands.

Many of the native gardenias of the Pacific Islands and elsewhere in the paleotropics contribute towards the production of a diverse array of natural products. Methoxylated and oxygenated flavonols, flavones, and triterpenes accumulate on the vegetative and floral buds as yellow to brown droplets of secreted resins. Many focused phytochemical studies of these bud exudates have been published, including a population-level study of two rare, sympatric species of Fiji, G. candida and G. grievei. The evolutionary significance of the gums and resins of gardenias in attracting or repelling invertebrate herbivores was explored by ecologists in 2018; specifically in the context of the repellent, insecticidal, and anti-oviposition activities of the ethanol-extracted essential oil of Gardenia jasminoides against whiteflies and mites.

== Species ==
As of July 2022 Plants of the World Online recognises 128 species in this genus, as follows:

- Gardenia actinocarpa Puttock
- Gardenia anapetes A.C.Sm.
- Gardenia angkorensis Pit.
- Gardenia annamensis Pit.
- Gardenia aqualla Stapf & Hutch.
- Gardenia archboldiana Merr. & L.M.Perry
- Gardenia aubryi Vieill.
- Gardenia barnesii Merr.
- Gardenia beamanii Y.W.Low
- Gardenia boninensis (Nakai) Tuyama ex T.Yamaz.
- Gardenia brachythamnus (K.Schum.) Launert
- Gardenia brevicalyx Rakoton. & A.P.Davis
- Gardenia brighamii H.Mann
- Gardenia buffalina (Lour.) Poir.
- Gardenia cambodiana Pit.
- Gardenia candida A.C.Sm.
- Gardenia carinata Wall. ex Roxb.
- Gardenia carstensensis Wernham
- Gardenia chanii Y.W.Low
- Gardenia chevalieri Pit.
- Gardenia clemensiae Merr. & L.M.Perry
- Gardenia collinsiae Craib
- Gardenia cornuta Hemsl.
- Gardenia coronaria Banks
- Gardenia costulata Ridl.
- Gardenia crameri Tirveng.
- Gardenia cuneata Kurz
- Gardenia dacryoides A.Cunn. ex Puttock
- Gardenia elata Ridl.
- Gardenia epiphytica Jongkind
- Gardenia erubescens Stapf & Hutch.
- Gardenia esculenta Stokes
- Gardenia ewartii Puttock
- Gardenia faucicola Puttock
- Gardenia fiorii Chiov.
- Gardenia flava (Lour.) Poir.
- Gardenia fosbergii Tirveng.
- Gardenia fucata R.Br. ex Benth.
- Gardenia fusca E.T.Geddes
- Gardenia gardneri Puttock
- Gardenia gjellerupii Valeton
- Gardenia gordonii Baker
- Gardenia grievei Horne ex Baker
- Gardenia griffithii Hook.f.
- Gardenia gummifera L.f.
- Gardenia hageniana Gilli
- Gardenia hainanensis Merr.
- Gardenia hansemannii K.Schum.
- Gardenia hillii Horne ex Baker
- Gardenia hutchinsoniana Turrill
- Gardenia imperialis K.Schum.
- Gardenia invaginata Merr. & L.M.Perry
- Gardenia ixorifolia R.Br. ex Hook.f.
- Gardenia jabiluka Puttock
- Gardenia jasminoides J.Ellis
- Gardenia kabaenensis Y.W.Low
- Gardenia kakaduensis Puttock
- Gardenia kamialiensis Takeuchi
- Gardenia lacciflua K.Krause
- Gardenia lamingtonii F.M.Bailey
- Gardenia lanutoo Reinecke
- Gardenia latifolia Aiton
- Gardenia leopoldiana De Wild. & T.Durand
- Gardenia leschenaultii D.Dietr.
- Gardenia longistipula Y.W.Low
- Gardenia magnifica E.T.Geddes
- Gardenia mannii H.St.John & Kuykendall
- Gardenia manongarivensis Rakoton. & A.P.Davis
- Gardenia maugaloae Lauterb.
- Gardenia megasperma F.Muell.
- Gardenia moszkowskii Valeton
- Gardenia mutabilis Reinw. ex Blume
- Gardenia nitida Hook.
- Gardenia obtusifolia Roxb. ex Hook.f.
- Gardenia ornata K.M.Wong
- Gardenia oudiepe Vieill.
- Gardenia ovularis F.M.Bailey
- Gardenia pallens Merr. & L.M.Perry
- Gardenia panduriformis Pierre ex Pit.
- Gardenia papuana F.M.Bailey
- Gardenia philastrei Pierre ex Pit.
- Gardenia posoquerioides S.Moore
- Gardenia propinqua Lindl.
- Gardenia psidioides Puttock
- Gardenia pterocalyx Valeton
- Gardenia pyriformis A.Cunn. ex Benth.
- Gardenia racemulosa Korth.
- Gardenia reflexisepala N.H.Xia & X.E.Ye
- Gardenia reinwardtiana Blume
- Gardenia remyi H.Mann
- Gardenia resinifera Roth
- Gardenia resiniflua Hiern
- Gardenia resinosa F.Muell.
- Gardenia rupicola Puttock
- Gardenia rutenbergiana (Baill. ex Vatke) J.-F.Leroy
- Gardenia sambiranensis Rakoton. & A.P.Davis
- Gardenia saxatilis E.T.Geddes
- Gardenia scabrella Puttock
- Gardenia schlechteri Bonati & Petitm.
- Gardenia schwarzii Puttock
- Gardenia sericea Puttock
- Gardenia similis (Craib) Craib
- Gardenia siphonocalyx Valeton
- Gardenia sokotensis Hutch.
- Gardenia sootepensis Hutch.
- Gardenia stenophylla Merr.
- Gardenia storckii Oliv.
- Gardenia subacaulis Stapf & Hutch.
- Gardenia subcarinata (Corner) Y.W.Low
- Gardenia taitensis DC.
- Gardenia tannaensis Guillaumin
- Gardenia ternifolia Schumach. & Thonn.
- Gardenia tessellaris Puttock
- Gardenia thailandica Tirveng.
- Gardenia thunbergia Thunb.
- Gardenia tinneae Kotschy & Heuglin
- Gardenia transvenulosa Verdc.
- Gardenia trochainii Sillans
- Gardenia tropidocarpa Wernham
- Gardenia truncata Craib
- Gardenia tubifera Wall. ex Roxb.
- Gardenia urvillei Montrouz.
- Gardenia vernicosa Merr. & L.M.Perry
- Gardenia vilhelmii Domin
- Gardenia vitiensis Seem.
- Gardenia vogelii Hook.f.
- Gardenia volkensii K.Schum.
- Gardenia vulcanica K.M.Wong

== Cultivation and uses ==
Gardenia plants are prized for the strong sweet scent of their flowers, which can be very large in size in some species.

Gardenia jasminoides (syn. G. grandiflora, G. florida) is cultivated as a house plant. This species can be difficult to grow because it originated in warm humid tropical areas. It demands high humidity to thrive, and bright (but not direct) light. It flourishes in acidic soils with good drainage and thrives on temperatures of 20–23 °C (68–73 °F) during the day and 15–16 °C (59–61 °F) in the evening. Potting soils developed especially for gardenias are available. G. jasminoides grows no larger than 18 inches in height and width when grown indoors. In climates where it can be grown outdoors, it can attain a height of 6 feet. If water touches the flowers, they will turn brown.

In Eastern Asia, Gardenia jasminoides is called zhīzi (梔子) in China, chija (치자) in Korea, and kuchinashi (梔子) in Japan. Its fruit is used as a yellow dye, used on fabric and food (including the Korean mung bean jelly called hwangpomuk). Its fruits are also used in traditional Chinese medicine for their clearing, calming, and cooling properties.

In France, gardenias are the flower traditionally worn by men as boutonnière when in evening dress. In The Age of Innocence, Edith Wharton suggests it was customary for upper-class men from New York City to wear a gardenia in their buttonhole during the Gilded Age.

Sigmund Freud remarked to the poet H.D. that gardenias were his favorite flower.

In tiki culture, Donn Beach, aka Don the Beachcomber, frequently wore a fresh lei of gardenias almost every day at his tiki bars, allegedly spending $7,800 for flowers over the course of four years in 1938. He named one of his drinks the mystery gardenia cocktail. Trader Vic frequently used the gardenia as a flower garnish in his tiki drinks, such as in the scorpion and outrigger tiara cocktails.

Several species occur in Hawaii, where gardenias are known as naʻu or nānū.

Hattie McDaniel famously wore gardenias in her hair when she accepted an Academy Award, the first for an African American, for Gone with the Wind. Mo'Nique Hicks later wore gardenias in her hair when she won her Oscar, as a tribute to McDaniel.

== Gallery ==
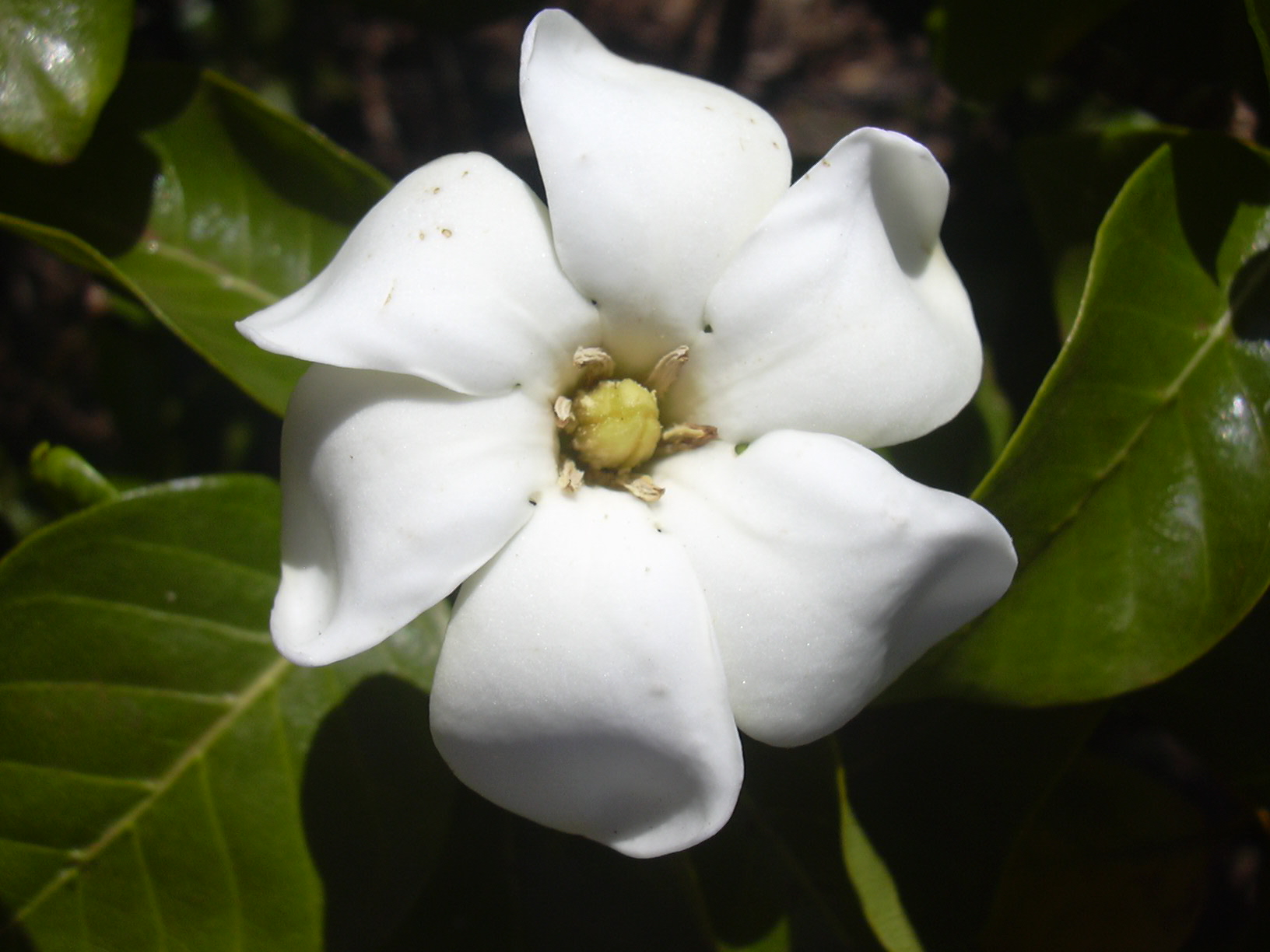
Gardenia brighamii

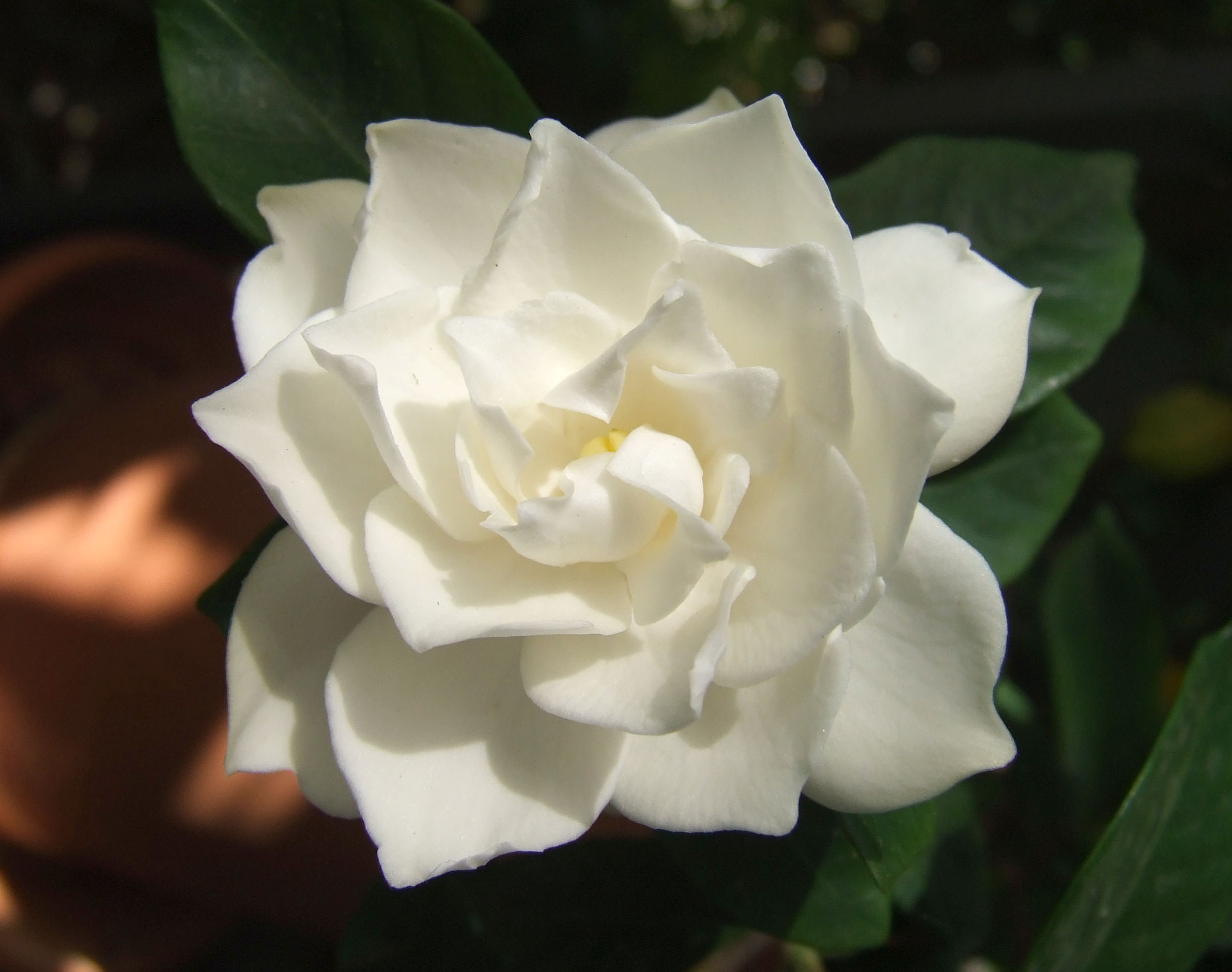
Gardenia jasminoides 'Plena'

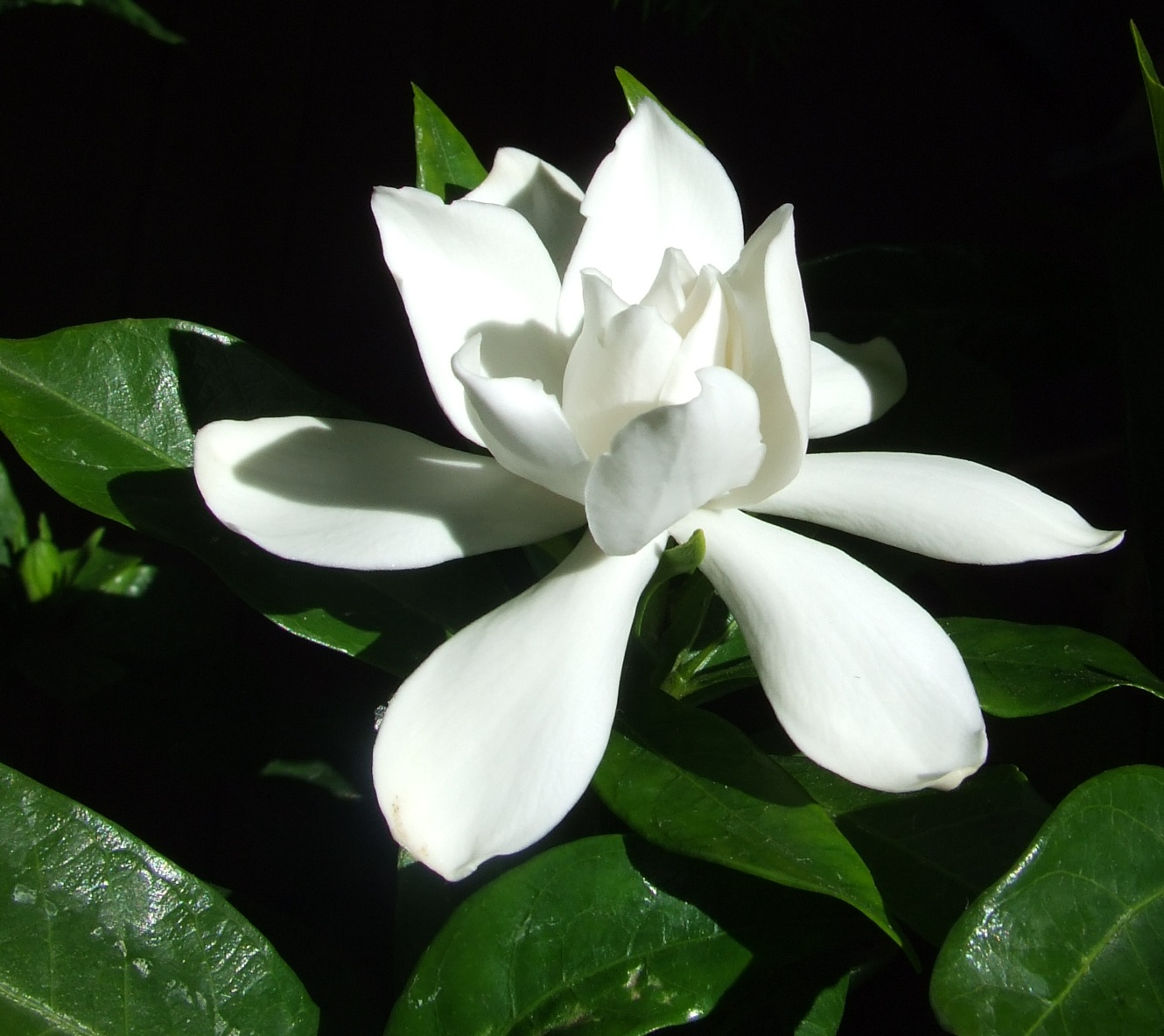
Gardenia jasminoidesl 'Radicans'

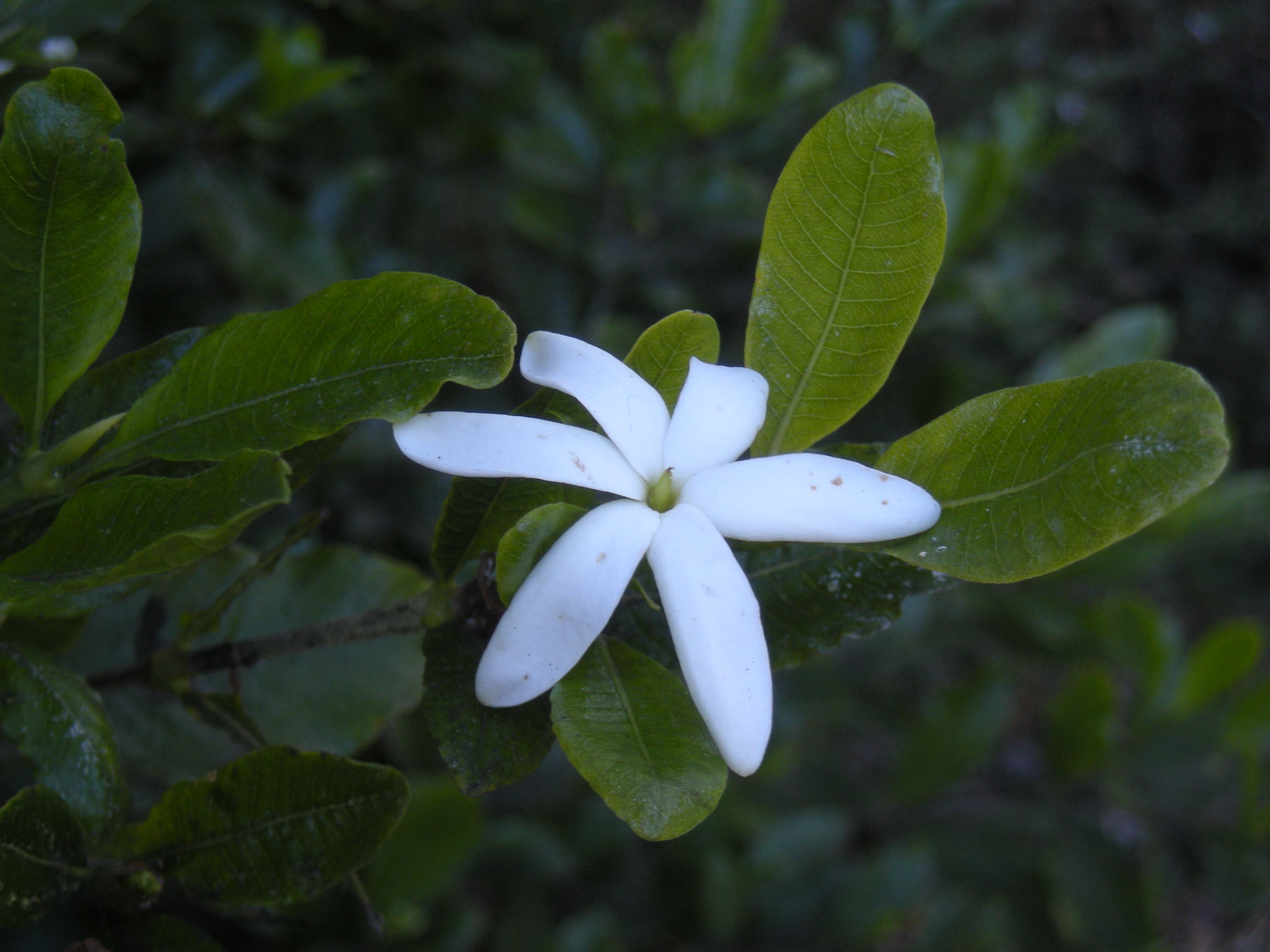
Gardenia psidioides

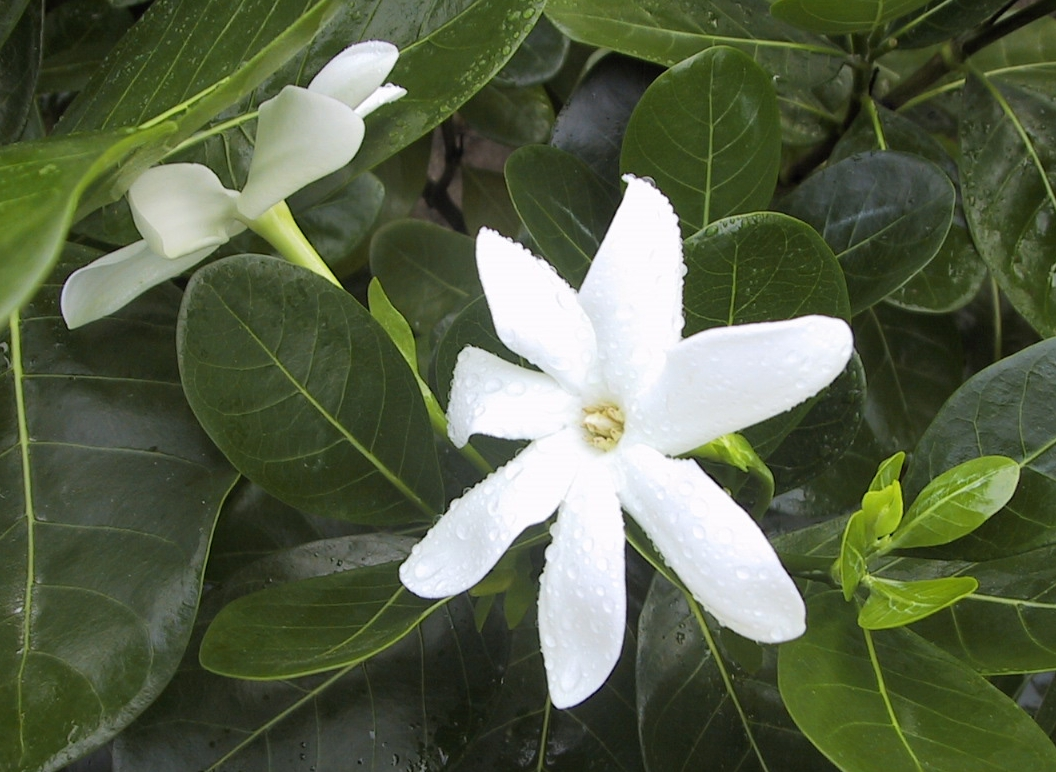
Gardenia taitensis

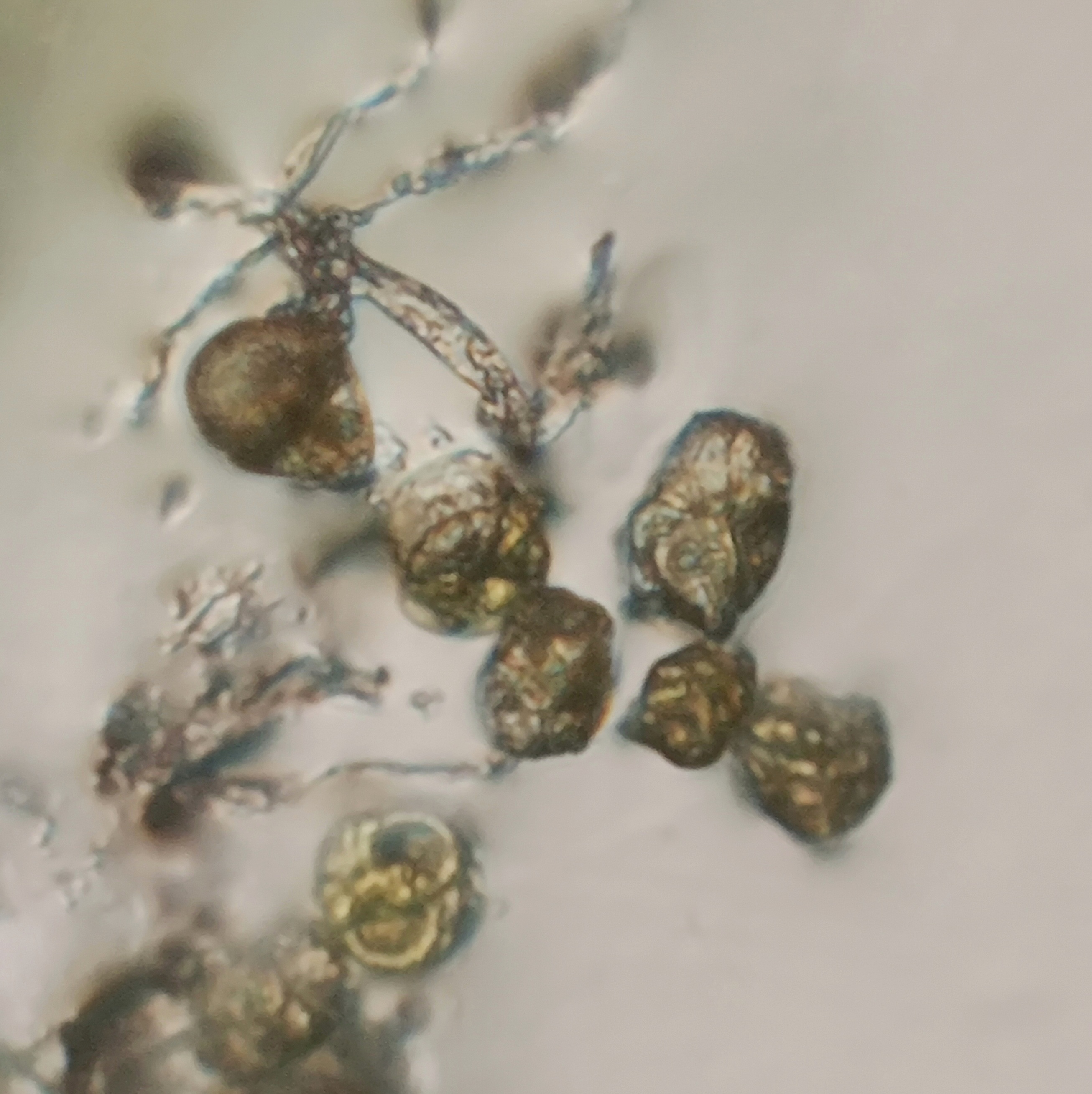
Pollen grains of Gardenia gummifera

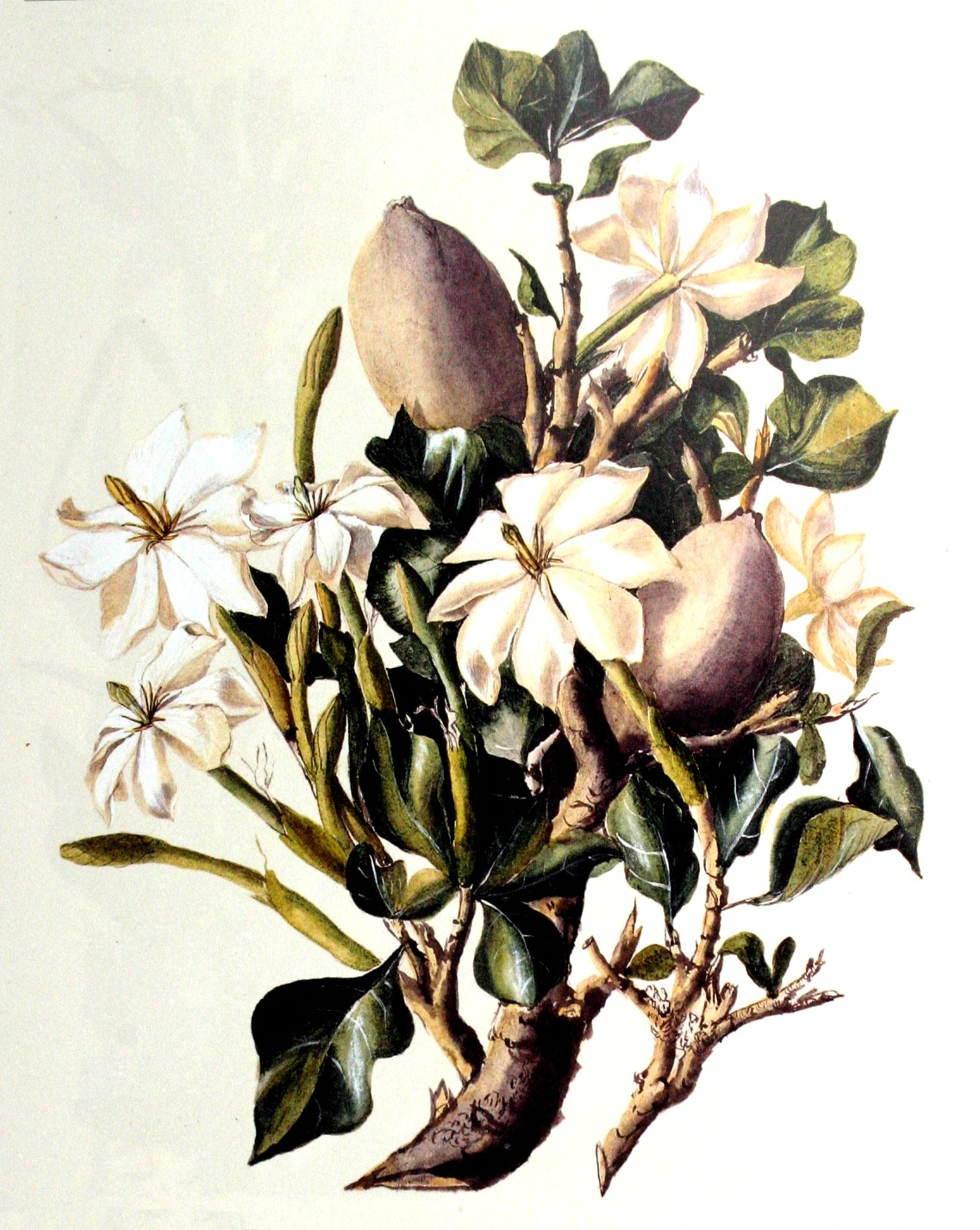
Gardenia thunbergia by Edith Struben (1868–1936)

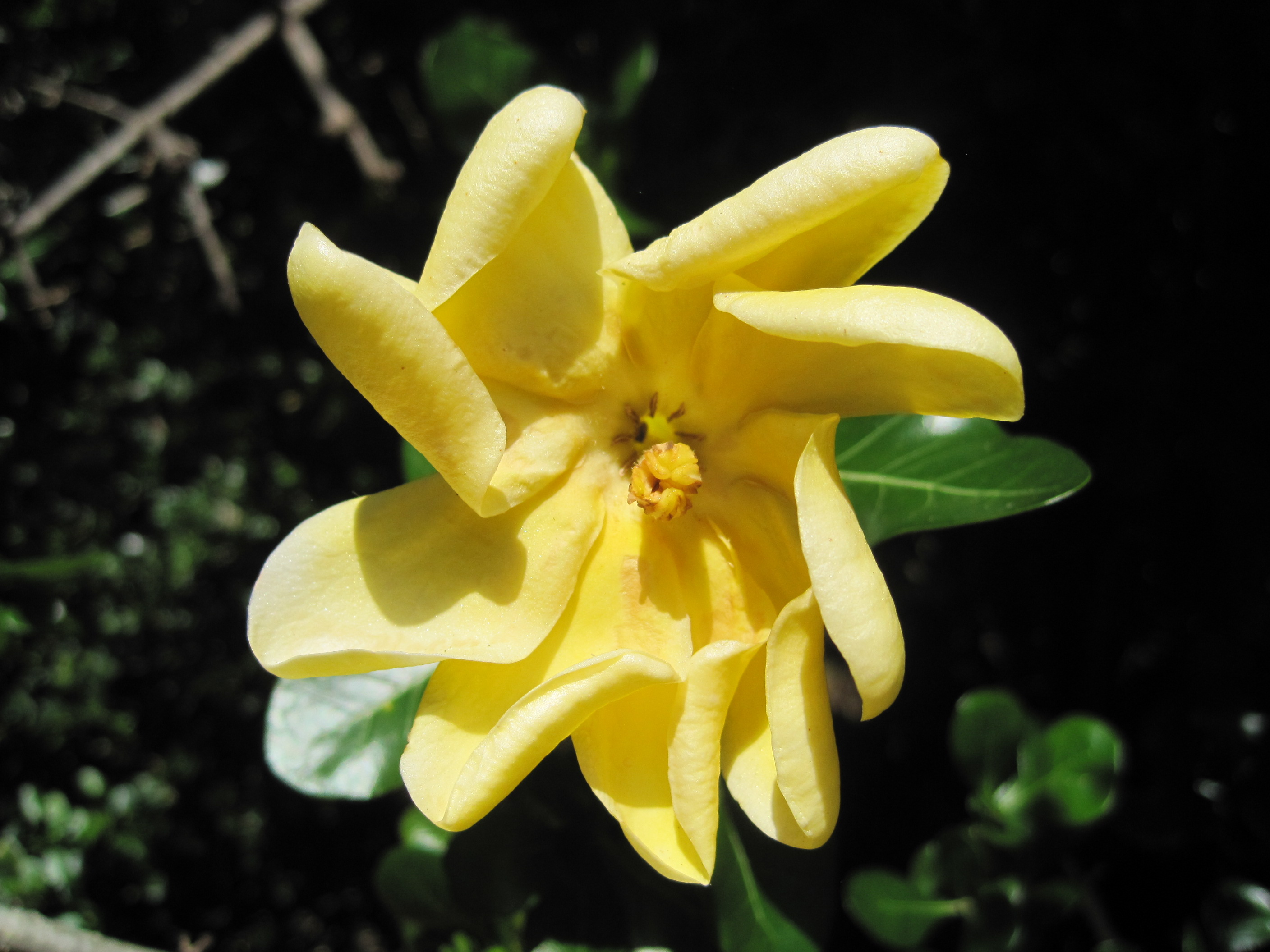
Gardenia volkensii flower

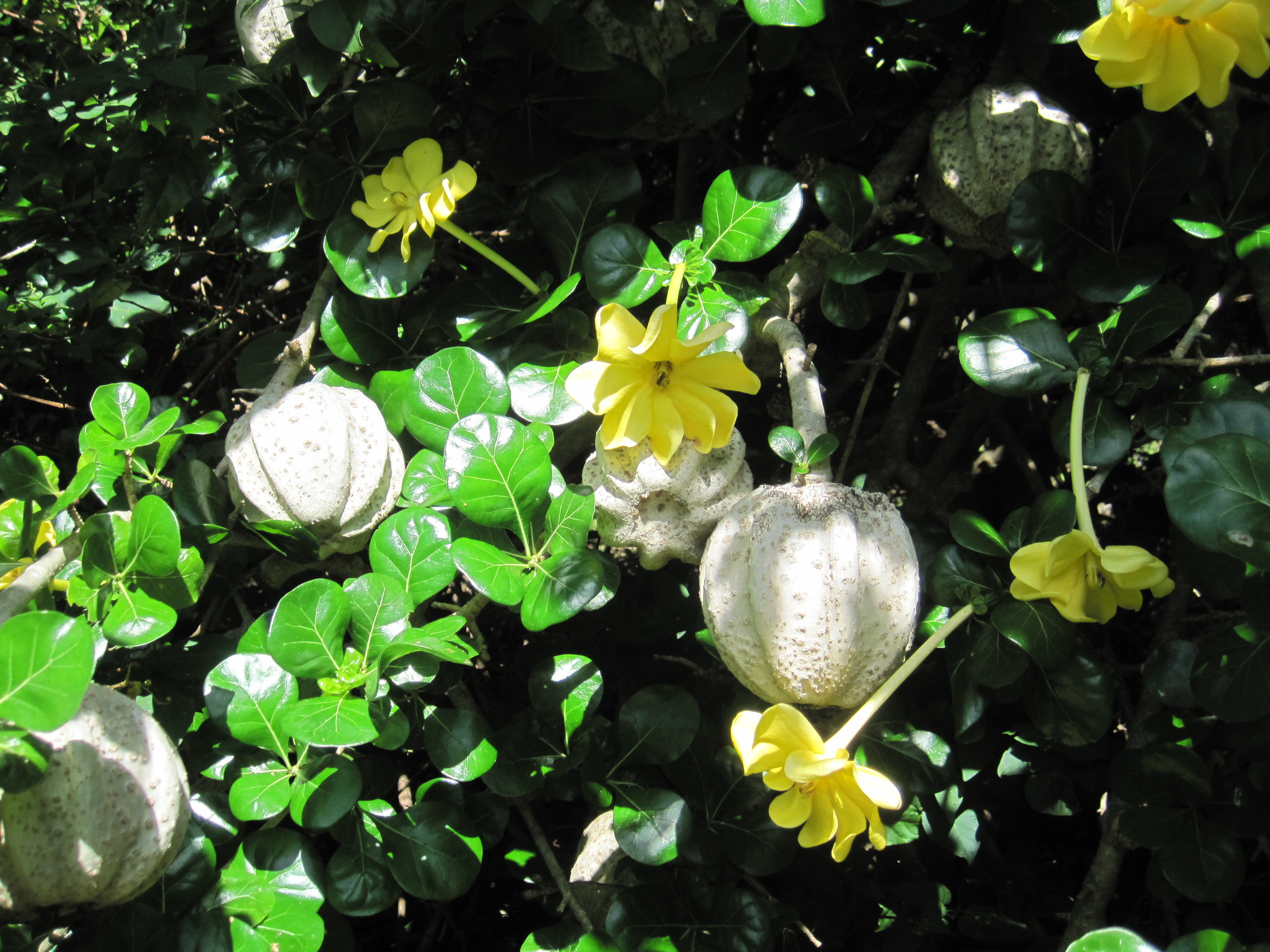
Gardenia volkensii flowers, foliage, fruit

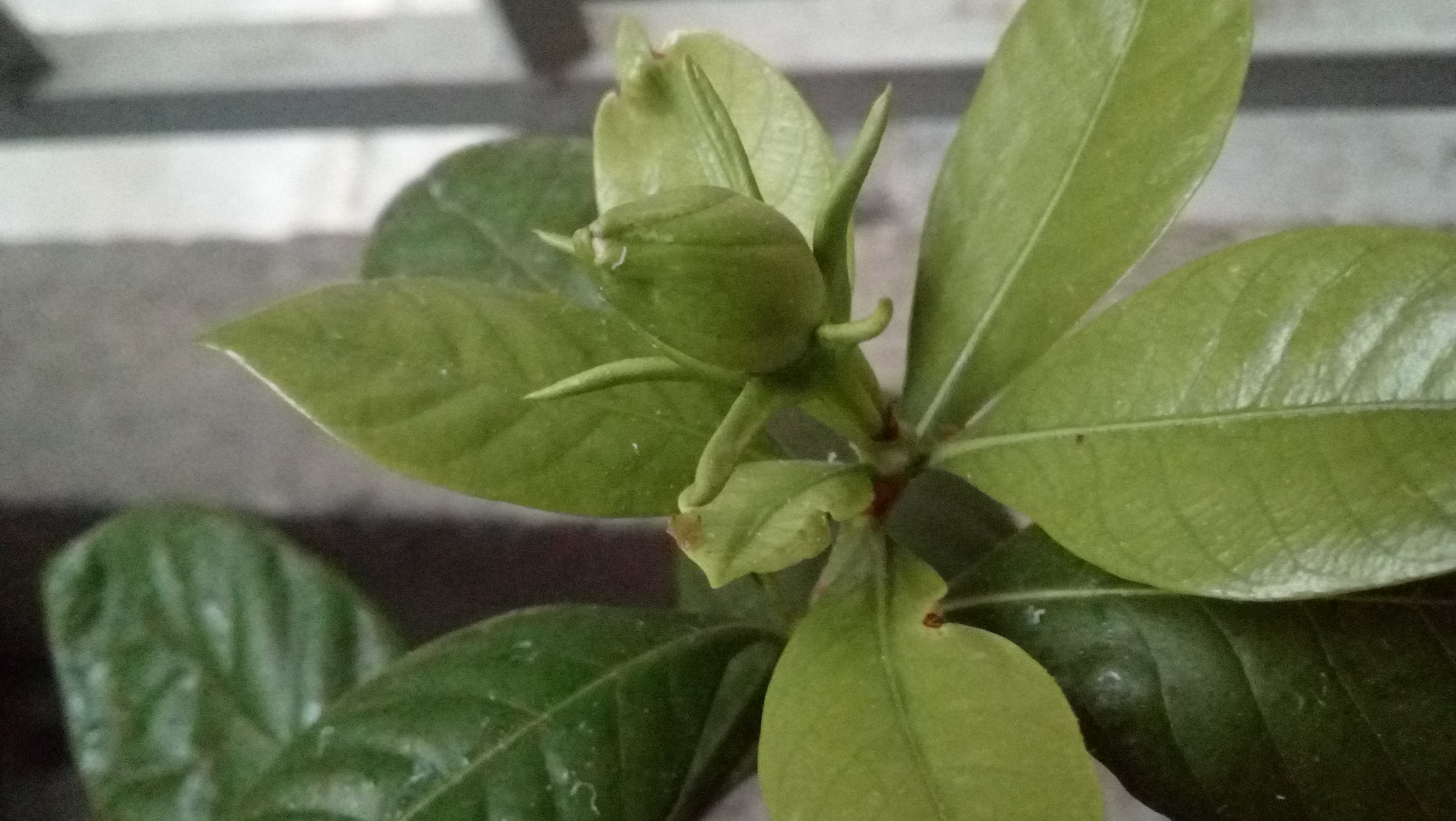
Blooming stages of gardenia flower (1 of 6)

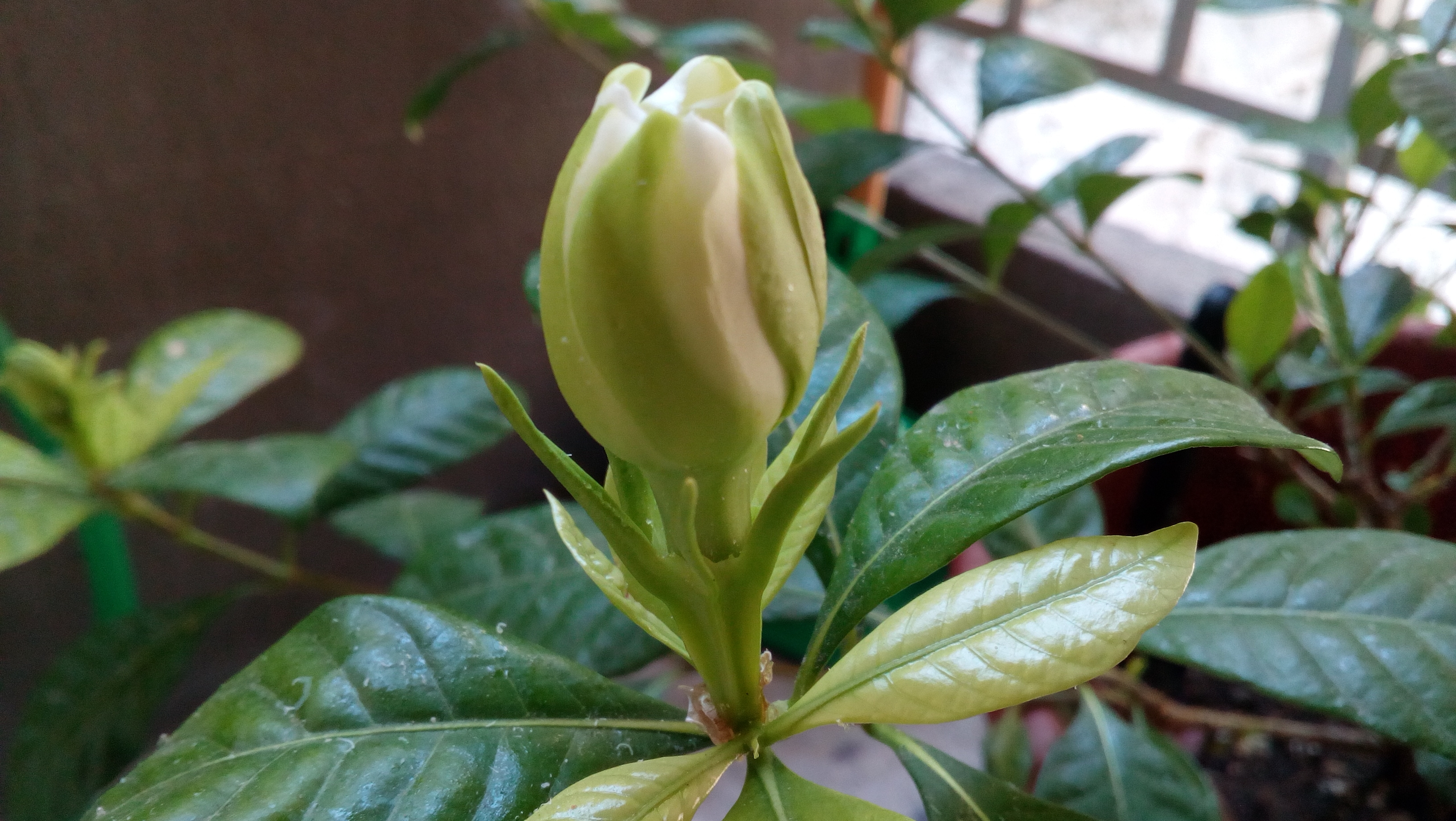
Blooming stages of gardenia flower (2 of 6)

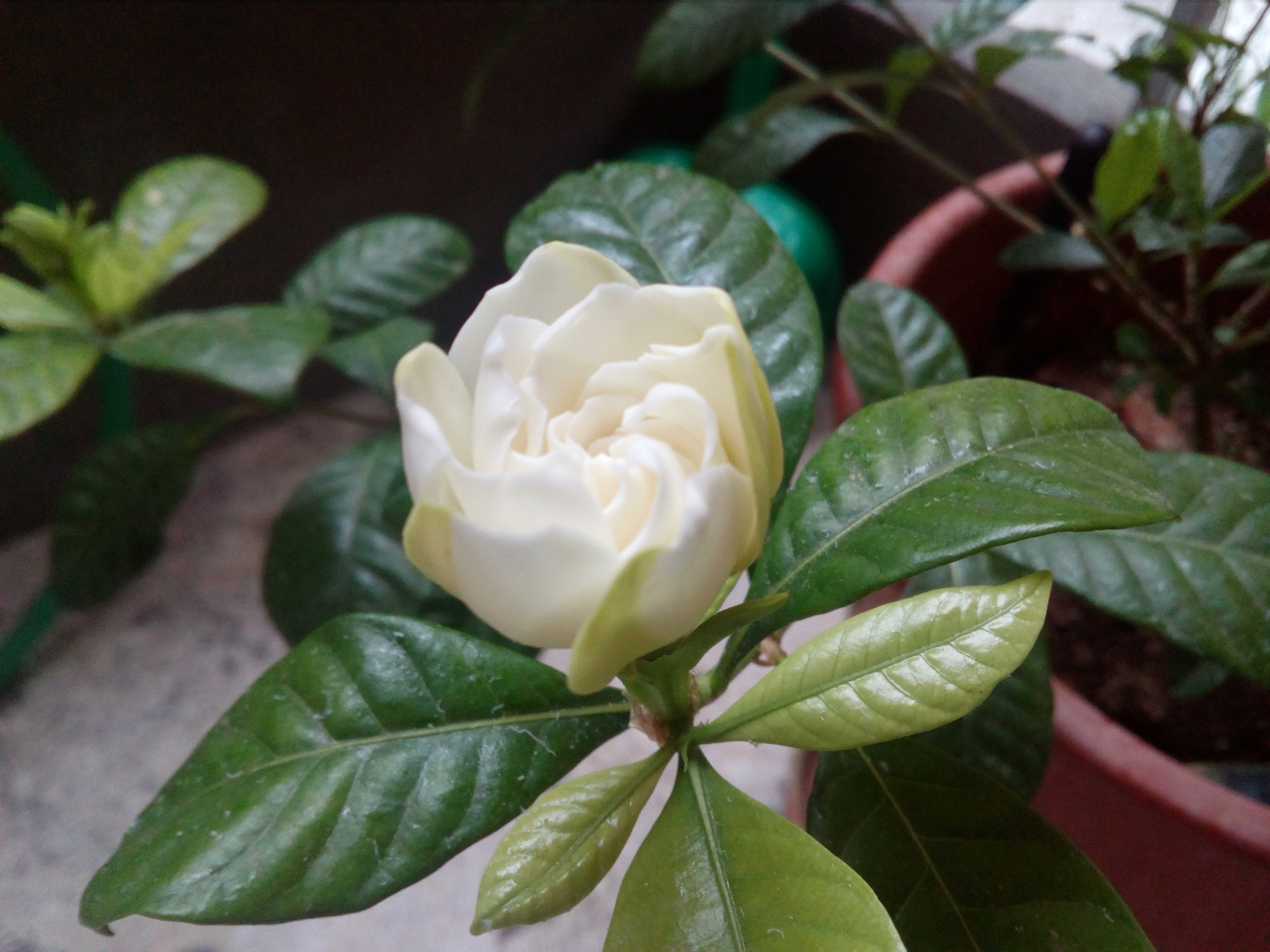
Blooming stages of gardenia flower (3 of 6)

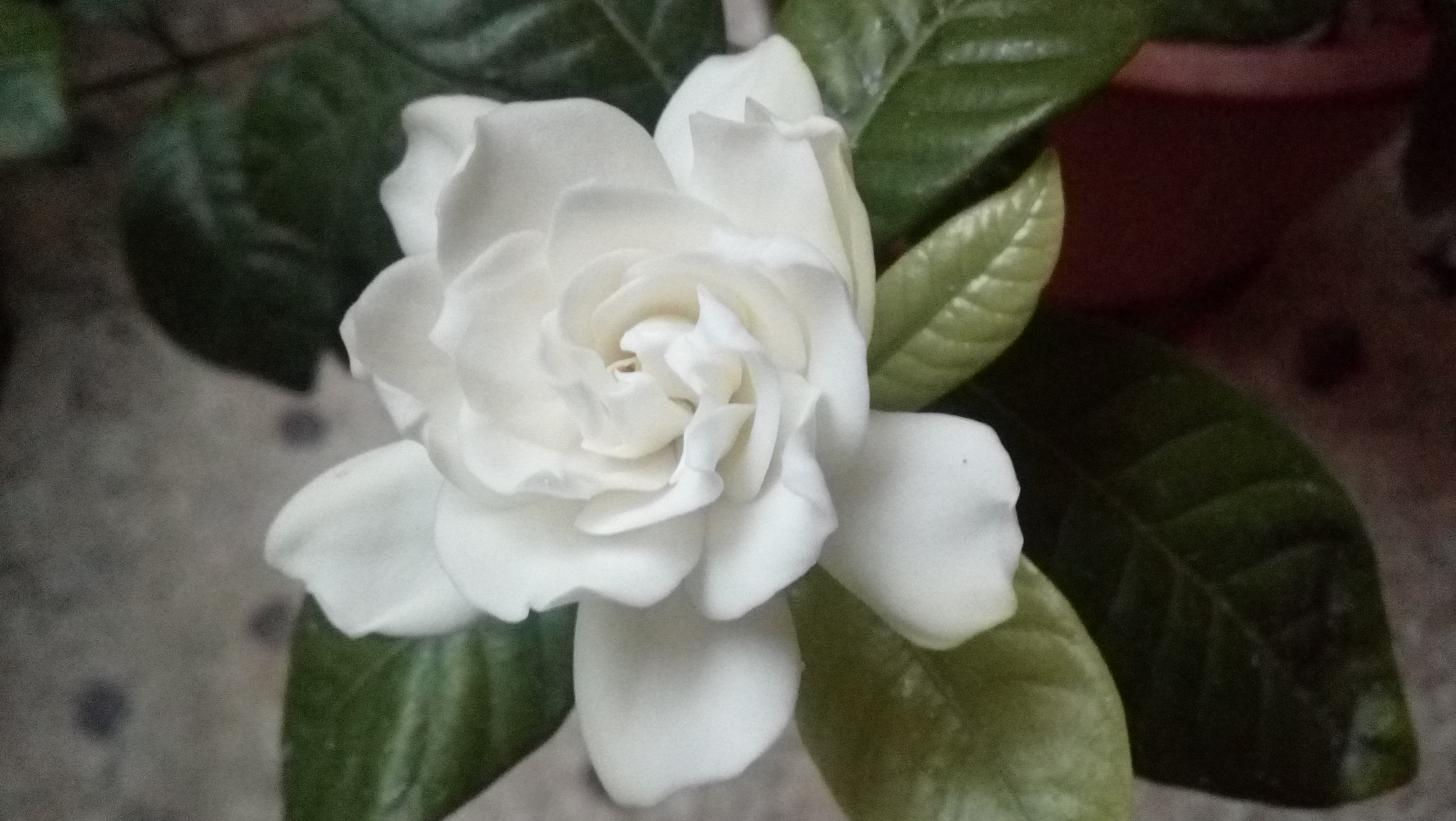
Blooming stages of gardenia flower (4 of 6)

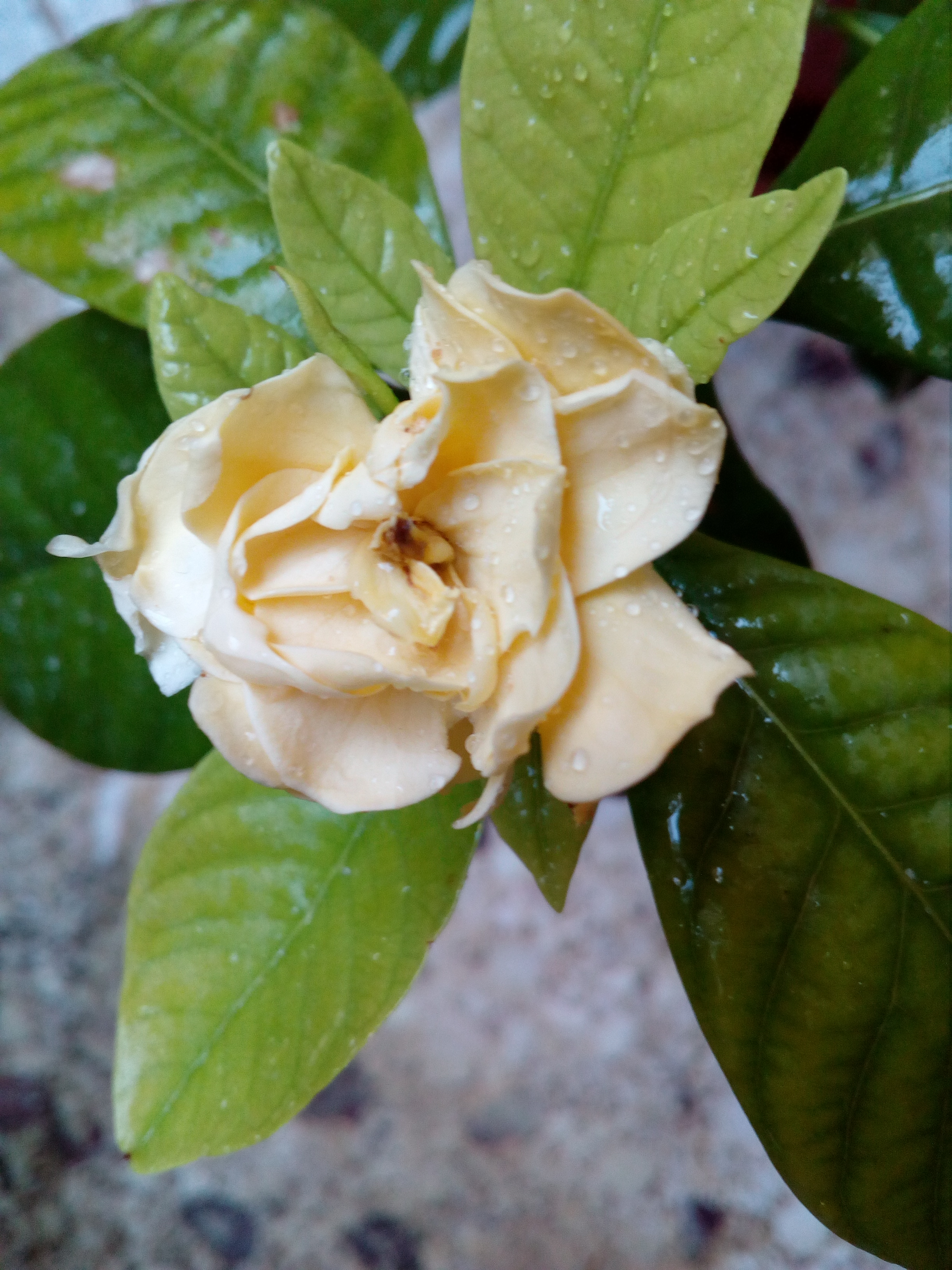
Blooming stages of gardenia flower (5 of 6)

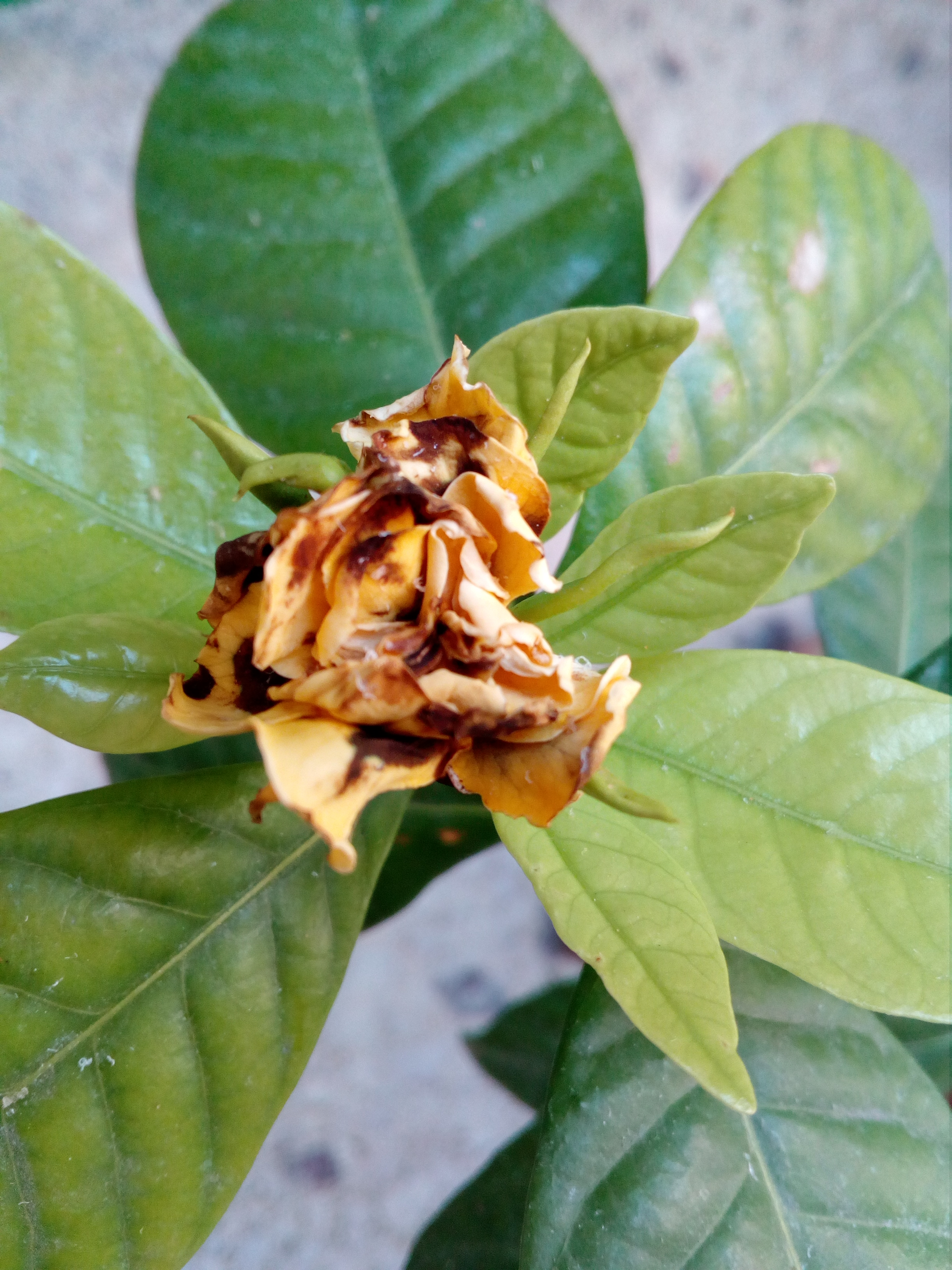
Blooming stages of gardenia flower (6 of 6)
