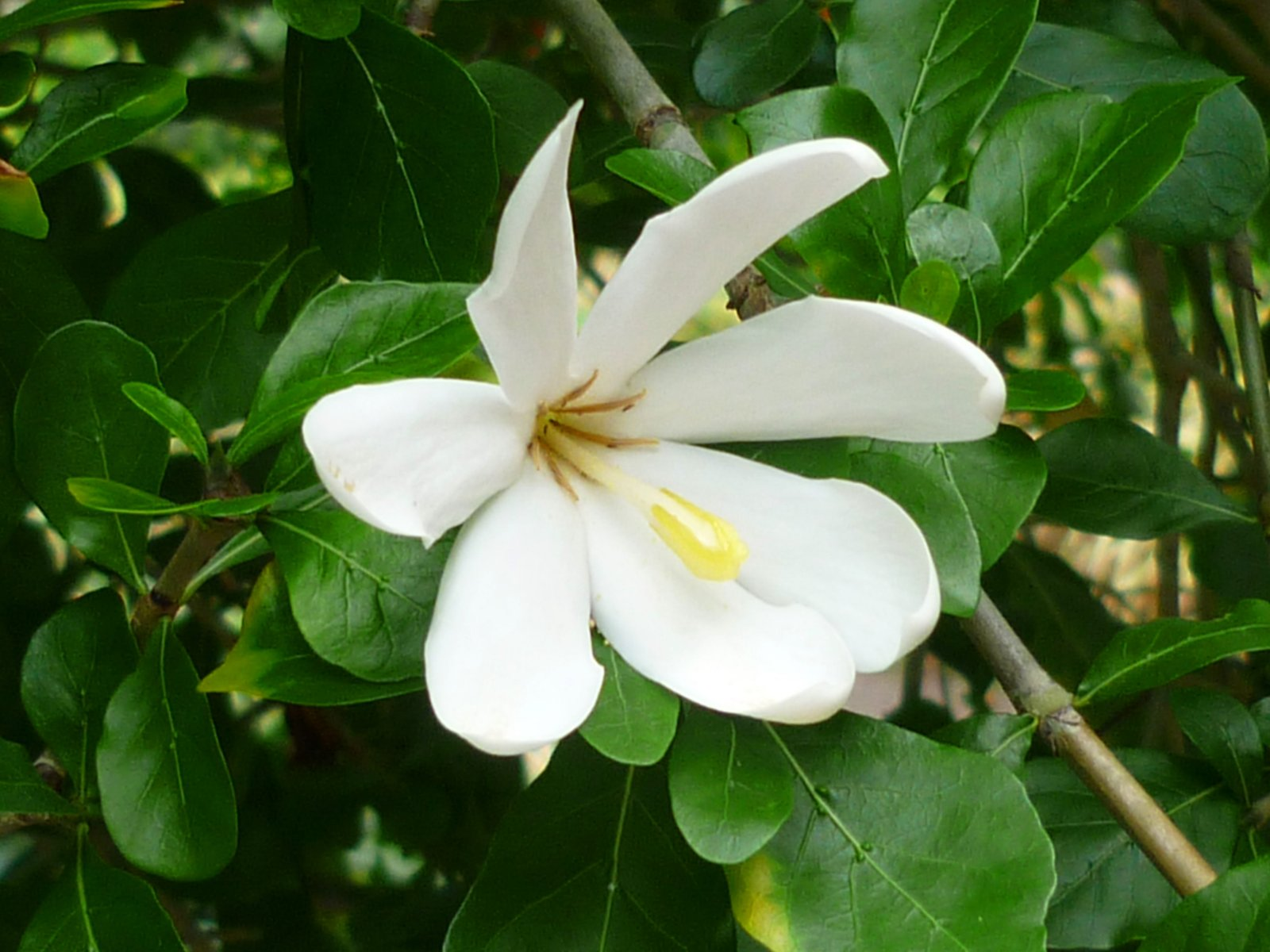

Conservation status
- Least Concern (IUCN 3.1)

Scientific classification
- Kingdom: Plantae
- Clade: Tracheophytes
- Clade: Angiosperms
- Clade: Eudicots
- Clade: Asterids
- Order: Gentianales
- Family: Rubiaceae
- Genus: Gardenia
- Species: G. cornuta

Binomial name
- Gardenia cornuta Hemsl.

Synonyms
- Gardenia plantii Rollison

= Gardenia cornuta =

Species of plant

Gardenia cornuta, commonly known as Tonga gardenia, Natal gardenia or horned gardenia, is a species of flowering plant in the family Rubiaceae. It is native to southern Africa.

Though specimens were collected in 1870, the species was not described until 1906.
