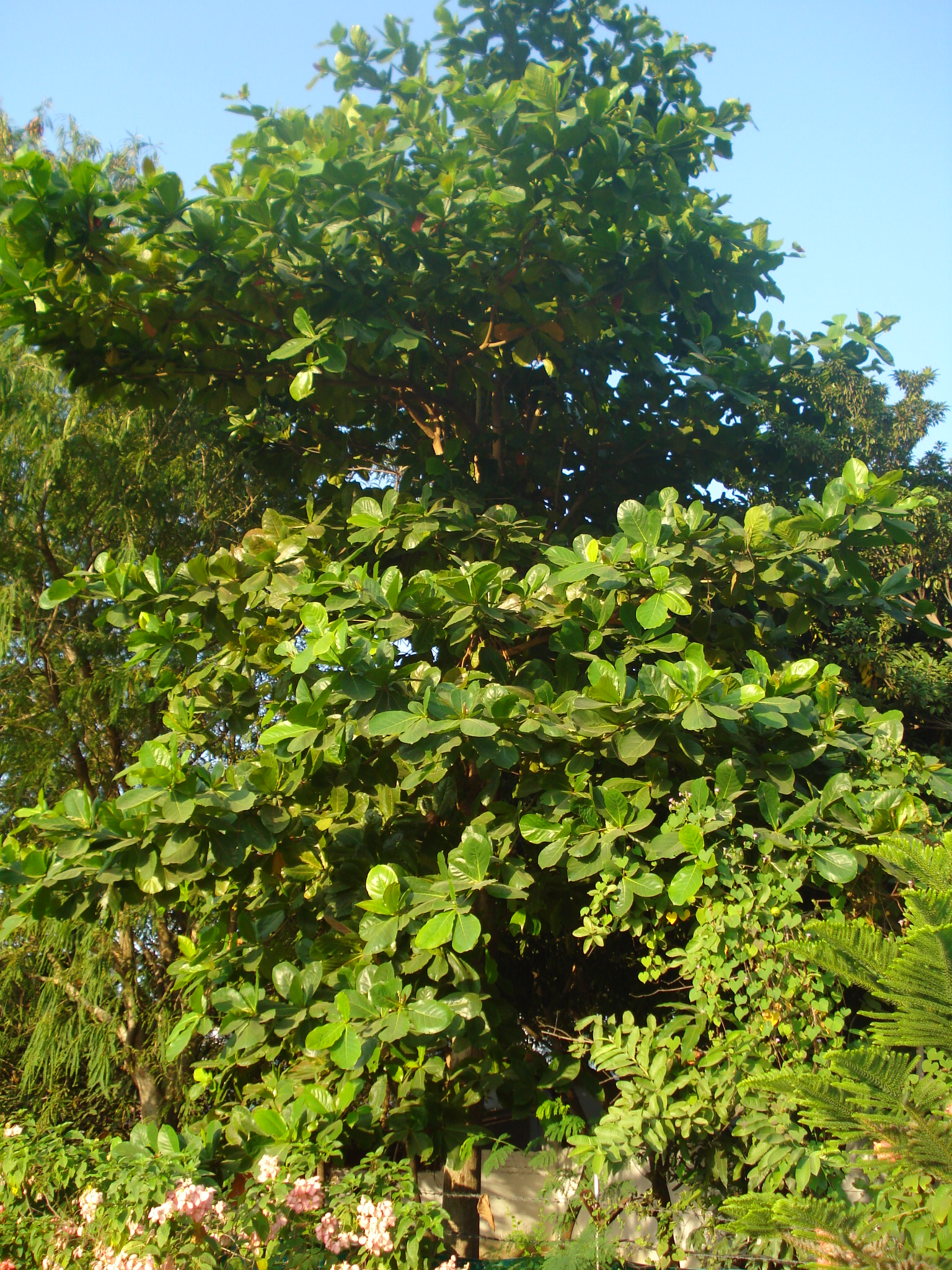
- At Nandan Kanan Park Bhopal

Scientific classification
- Kingdom: Plantae
- Clade: Tracheophytes
- Clade: Angiosperms
- Clade: Eudicots
- Clade: Asterids
- Order: Gentianales
- Family: Rubiaceae
- Genus: Gardenia
- Species: G. latifolia

Binomial name
- Gardenia latifolia Ait.

= Gardenia latifolia =

Species of plant

Gardenia latifolia, also called papra or Hindi:पापडा, Bengali: যোজনগন্ধা, Tamizh: Kattu marikalam or Kumbai is medium-sized to large, long-lived tree of family Rubiaceae. Its English common name is Indian Boxwood or Ceylon Boxwood. It is found in the forests of Madhya Pradesh in India, and has been widely cultivated elsewhere, to the point of naturalization, especially in Nigeria, West Africa where the tree is highly valued for both its fruit and shade.

Indian boxwood is a small deciduous tree or large shrub, which often grows on other small plants, which it eventually kills, the way Figs do. Bark is greenish-grey, peeling and leaving smooth, concave, rounded depressions. Oppositely arranged, or whorled leaves have very short stalks, and are oval to obovate, smooth, with a small hairy gland in the axils of the veins on the underside, 6–8 in long, by about 3 in broad. Flowers appear singly at the end of branches. Sepal cup is bell-shaped, segments or teeth very irregular. Flowers have salver-form, meaning starting from a narrow tube and suddenly flaring into a flat arrangement of petals. Flowers are white or pale lemon-yellow, orange when fading. Flower tube is about 2 inches long, with 5-9 obliquely obovate petals, about 1/2 as long as the tube. Stigma is club-shaped, thick, and fleshy, bipartite, segments bifid. Berry is even, nearly spherical, crowned with the whole limbs of the sepal. Flowering: April–July.

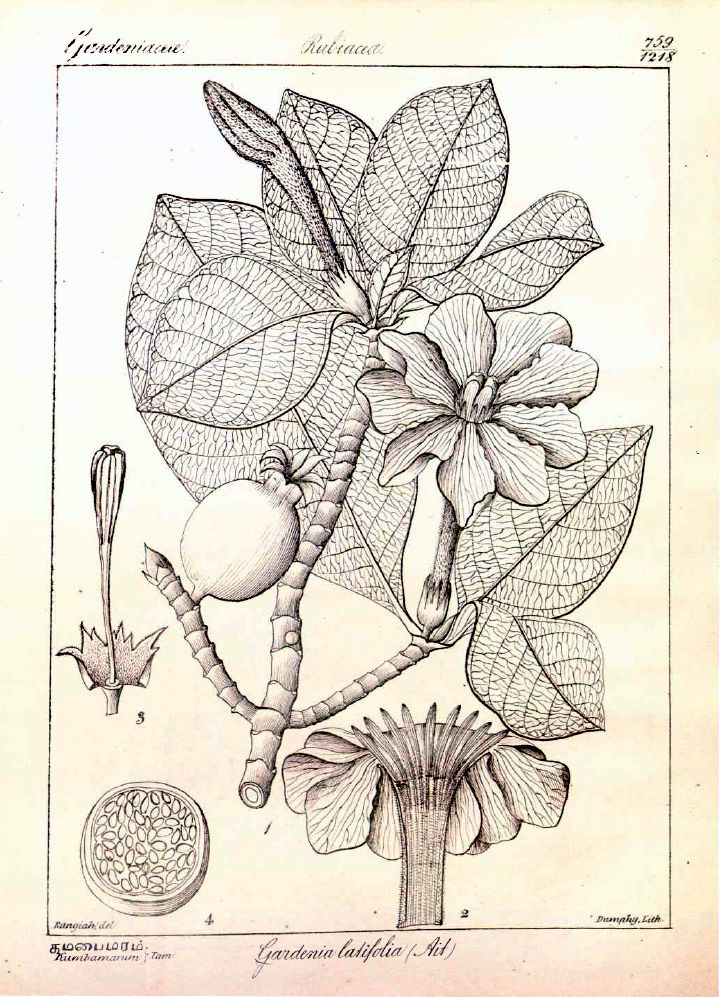
Gardenia latifolia from Robert Wight's Icones Plantarum Indiae Orientalis
