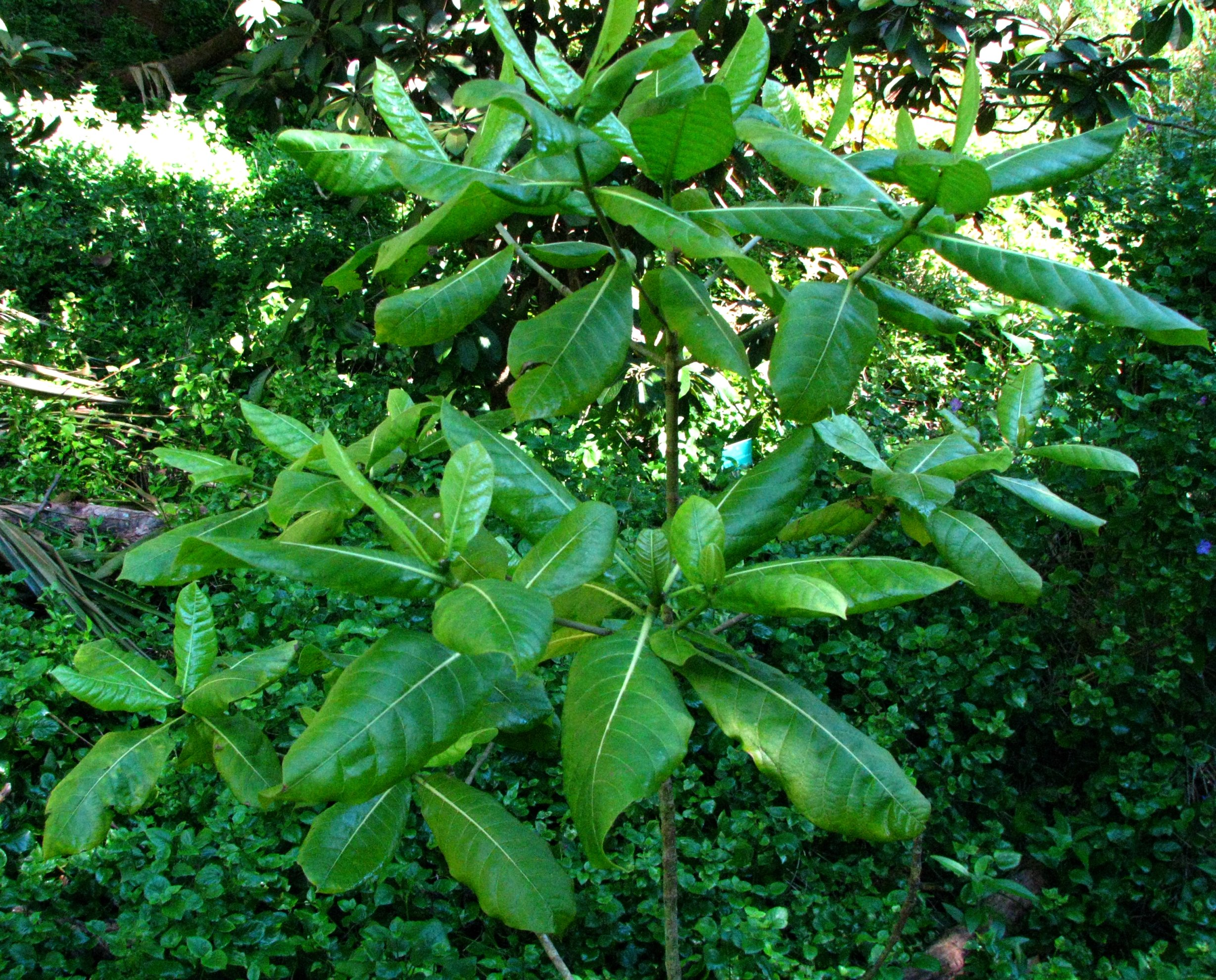

Conservation status
- Critically Endangered (IUCN 2.3)

Scientific classification
- Kingdom: Plantae
- Clade: Tracheophytes
- Clade: Angiosperms
- Clade: Eudicots
- Clade: Asterids
- Order: Gentianales
- Family: Rubiaceae
- Genus: Gardenia
- Species: G. mannii

Binomial name
- Gardenia mannii H.St.John & Kuykend.

= Gardenia mannii =

Species of plant

Gardenia mannii, the nānū, Oahu gardenia or Mann's gardenia, is a species of flowering tree in the family Rubiaceae, that is endemic to the island of Oʻahu in Hawaiʻi. It inhabits coastal mesic, mixed mesic, and wet forests at elevations of 100–730 m (330–2,400 ft) in the Koʻolau and Waiʻanae Ranges. It is threatened by habitat loss.

There are 18 populations remaining with a total of no more than 110 individuals.
