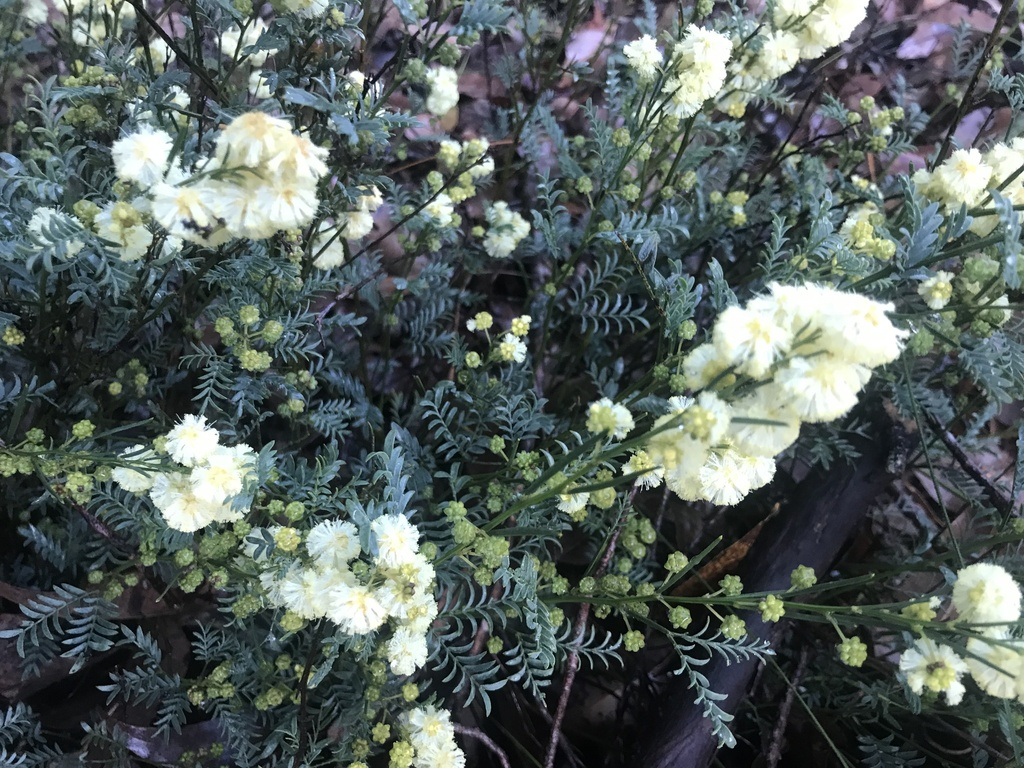
- Near Manjimup

Scientific classification
- Kingdom: Plantae
- Clade: Tracheophytes
- Clade: Angiosperms
- Clade: Eudicots
- Clade: Rosids
- Order: Fabales
- Family: Fabaceae
- Subfamily: Caesalpinioideae
- Clade: Mimosoid clade
- Genus: Acacia
- Species: A. insolita

Binomial name
- Acacia insolita E.Pritz.
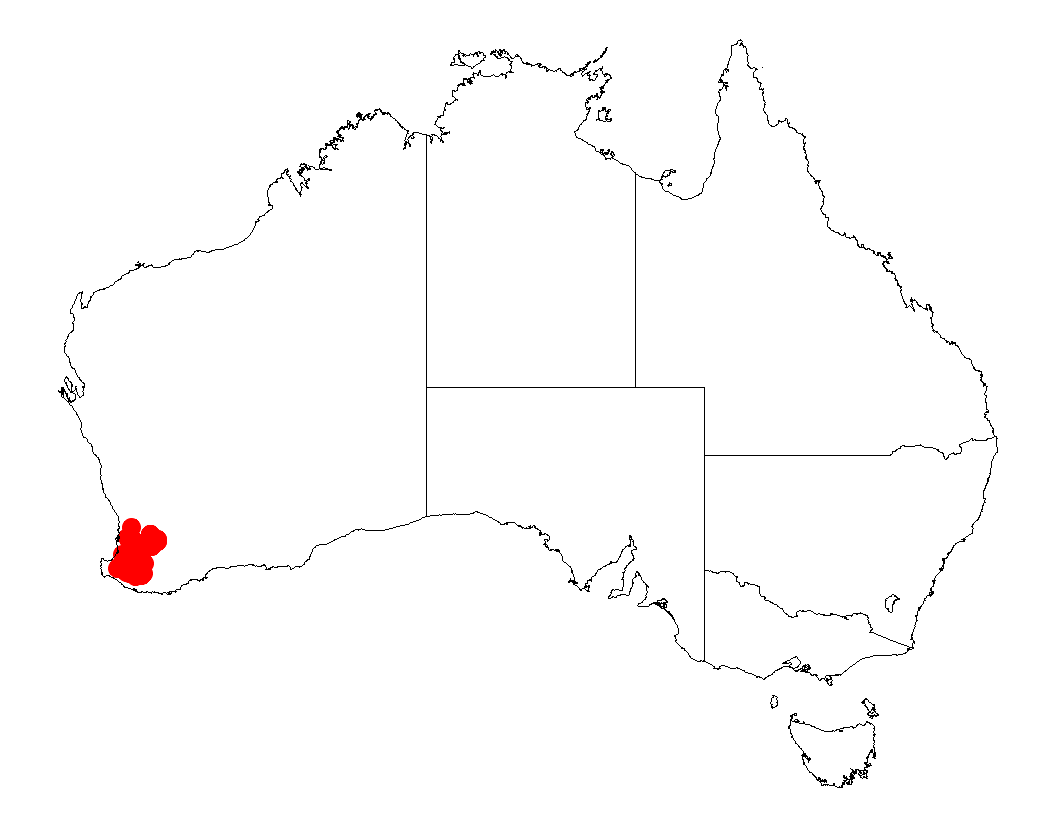
- Occurrence data from AVH

Synonyms
- Racosperma insolitum (E.Pritz.) Pedley

= Acacia insolita =

Species of legume

Acacia insolita is a species of flowering plant in the family Fabaceae and is endemic to the south-west of Western Australia. It is a shrub or subshrub sometimes with bipinnate leaves with one pair of pinnae, each with two to twelve pairs of lance-shaped to narrowly oblong or elliptic pinnules, or with narrowly linear phyllodes. The flowers are cream-coloured to golden yellow and arranged in spherical heads and the pods are linear to narrowly oblong, crusty and glabrous.

== Description ==
Acacia insolita is a shrub or subshrub that typically grows to a height of 0.1–1.2 m (3.9 in – 3 ft 11.2 in) and has glabrous or hairy stems and foliage. The leaves on mature plants are often bipinnate on a petiole 5–25 mm (0.20–0.98 in) long, the rachis 5–40 mm (0.20–1.57 in) long, usually with a single pair of pinnae. Each pinna has two to twelve lance-shaped to narrowly oblong or elliptic pinnules mostly 5–10 mm (0.20–0.39 in) long and 1–3 mm (0.039–0.118 in) wide. The phyllodes are narrowly linear, flat or four-sided in cross section, 10–90 mm (0.39–3.54 in) long and 0.5–4 mm (0.020–0.157 in) wide. The flowers are borne in a spherical head in axils or on the ends of branches on a minutely hairy peduncle 5–12 mm (0.20–0.47 in) long, each head with 12 to 19 cream-coloured to golden yellow flowers. Flowering occurs from June to September, and the pods are linear to narrowly oblong up to 80 mm (3.1 in) long, 4–7 mm (0.16–0.28 in) wide glabrous and crusty. The seeds are 3–4 mm (0.12–0.16 in) long, glossy dark brown to black with an aril.

== Taxonomy ==
Acacia insolita was first formally described in 1904 by Ernst Pritzel in Botanische Jahrbücher für Systematik, Pflanzengeschichte und Pflanzengeographie.

In 1999, Bruce Maslin described three subspecies of A. insolita in the journal Nuytsia, but in a later edition of the same journal, Maslin raised Acacia insolita subsp. efoliolata to Acacia adjutrices.

The remaining two subspecies are accepted by the Australian Plant Census:

- Acacia insolita subsp. insolita has flat, green to grey-green pinnules.
- Acacia insolita subsp. recurva has concave pinnules often folded lengthwise, turned down and more or less glaucous.

== Distribution and habitat ==
Subspecies insolita grows in laterite, mainly in Eucalyptus forest or woodland and occurs in the Darling Range from Dwellingup and south to Nannup in the Avon Wheatbelt and Jarrah Forest bioregions of south-western Western Australia.

Subspecies recurva is only known from the type locality where it grows on a laterite ridge in woodland with Dryandra nobilis.

== Conservation status ==
Subspecies insolita is listed as not threatened by the Government of Western Australia Department of Biodiversity, Conservation and Attractions, but subspecies recurva is listed as "Threatened Flora (Declared Rare Flora — Extant)" by the Western Australian Government Department of Parks and Wildlife.

== See also ==
- List of Acacia species
