= Kerosene bush =

Kerosene bush is a common name for several plants and may refer to:

- Banksia nobilis, a plant species from Western Australia
- Ozothamnus cupressoides, a plant species from eastern Australia
- Ozothamnus hookeri, a plant species from eastern Australia
