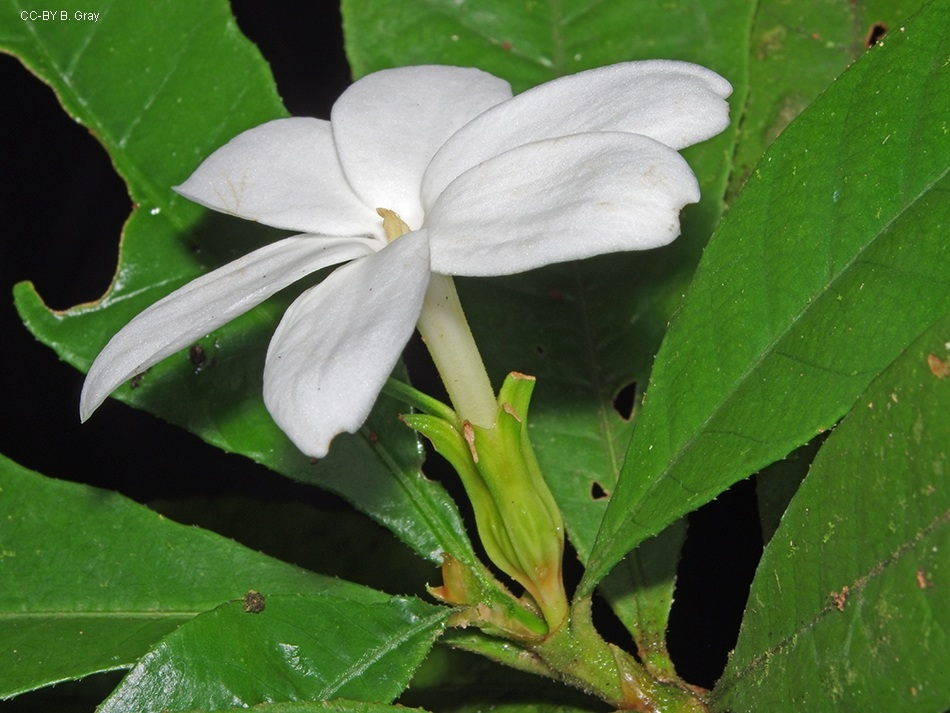
- Female flower

Conservation status
- Endangered (NCA)

Scientific classification
- Kingdom: Plantae
- Clade: Embryophytes
- Clade: Tracheophytes
- Clade: Angiosperms
- Clade: Eudicots
- Clade: Asterids
- Order: Gentianales
- Family: Rubiaceae
- Genus: Gardenia
- Species: G. actinocarpa

Binomial name
- Gardenia actinocarpa Puttock

= Gardenia actinocarpa =

Species of flowering plant

Gardenia actinocarpa is a rare and endangered plant in the coffee and gardenia family Rubiaceae, native to a very restricted area within the Wet Tropics rainforest of northeastern Queensland.

== Description ==
This species is an evergreen understory plant reaching up to 5 m (16 ft) in height but flowering and fruiting once it reaches around 1 m (3 ft 3 in). It is a spindly woody shrub with a stem diameter of up to 3 cm (1.2 in).

The leaves are opposite and chartaceous (thin and flexible) with wavy edges, glossy mid green above and paler below, and are attached to the twigs on a petiole around 9 mm (0.35 in) long. The leaves measure up to 27 cm (11 in) long and 7 cm (2.8 in) wide, and are generally obovate in shape. They have a long attenuate (tapering) base and an extended "drip tip". The stipules are conical, up to 7 mm (0.28 in) long and resinous.

Flowers are terminal, solitary, actinomorphic and 6-merous, borne on pedicels between 5 and 15 mm (0.20 and 0.59 in) long. The calyx tube is green, coriaceous, and has six external longitudinal ridges extending into the laterally compressed calyx lobes. The corolla is about 50 mm (2.0 in) in diameter, white with six elliptical petals, and a corolla tube measuring about 15–25 mm (0.59–0.98 in) long.

Fruits are green, ellipsoidal, up to 46 mm (1.8 in) long by 32 mm (1.3 in) wide, glabrous, with six longitudinal ridges, and the calyx lobes remain attached at the apex. They contain a number of seeds which are up to 4.5 mm (0.18 in) diameter by 1.6 mm (0.063 in) thick.

=== Phenology ===
Flowering occurs from November to June and fruits mature from February to November. This species is dioecious – that is, male and female flowers are produced on separate plants – with little variation in size between the two sexes.

== Taxonomy ==
Gardenia actinocarpa was described by the Australian botanist C.F. Puttock from samples collected by Geoff Tracey and Leonard Webb in 1973 from Oliver Creek, near Cape Tribulation, Queensland. Puttock's paper was published in Austrobaileya, the annual journal of the Queensland Herbarium, in 1988.

=== Etymology ===
The species epithet actinocarpa derives from the Ancient Greek words aktī́s, meaning ray, and karpós, meaning fruit. It refers to the star-shaped cross-sectional appearance of the fruit.

== Distribution and habitat ==
This rare species is found in a very restricted range, specifically the rainforested alluvial lowlands of a single watershed within the Daintree rainforest. A study published in 2001 has suggested that this is a relatively new species which is still expanding its range.

== Conservation ==
G. actinocarpa is classified as endangered under the Australian Government's Environment Protection and Biodiversity Conservation Act 1999 and the Nature Conservation Act 1992 of Queensland. Threats facing the species include the potential fragmentation of its habitat, limited female fecundity (when compared with related species), rapid loss of seed viability, and geographical barriers.

As of 7 April 2022, it has not been assessed by IUCN.

== Gallery ==
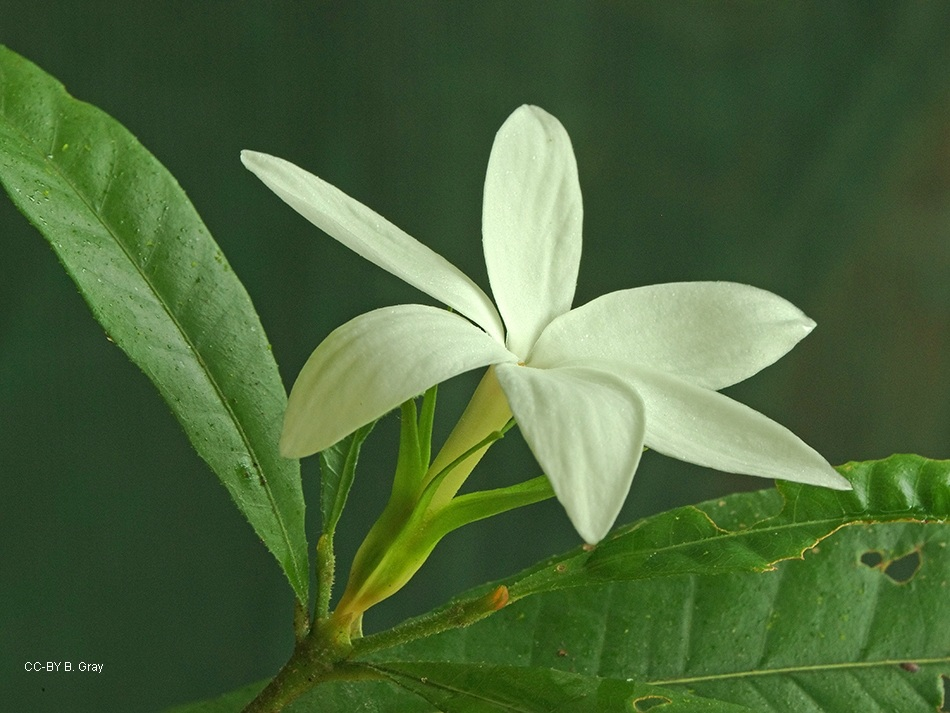
Male flower

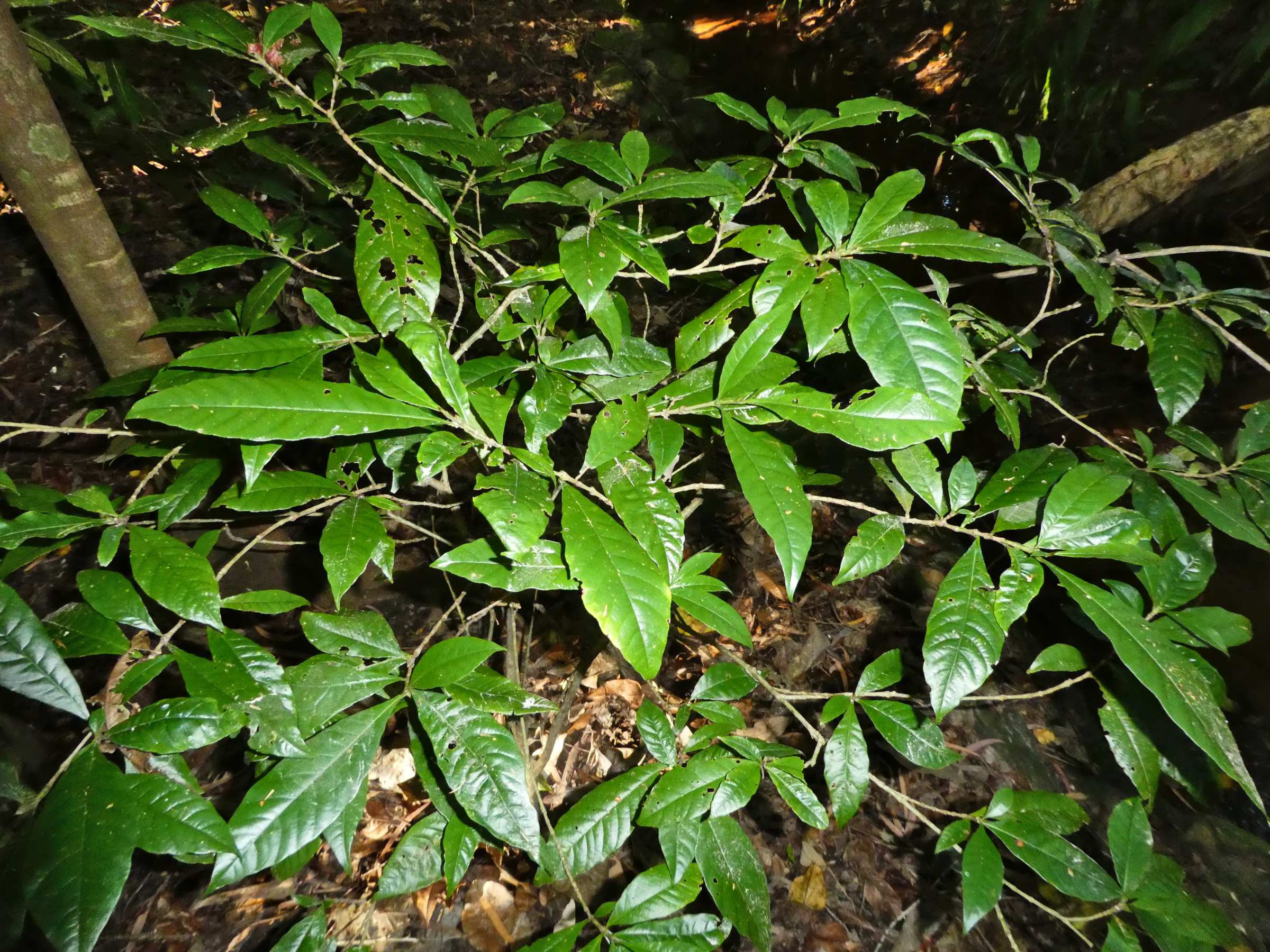
Cairns Botanic Gardens, May 2021

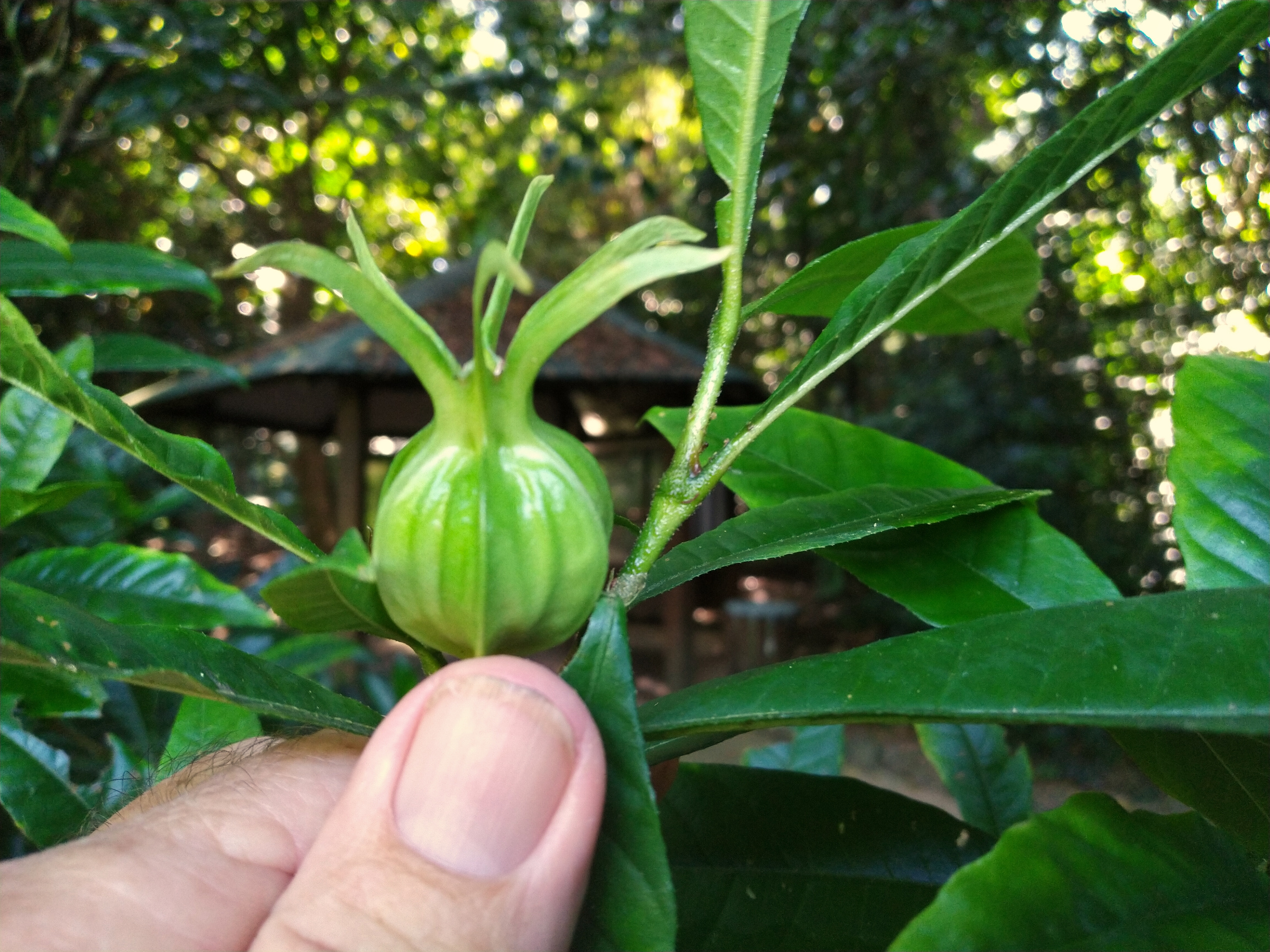
Developing fruit. Cairns Botanic Gardens April 2022

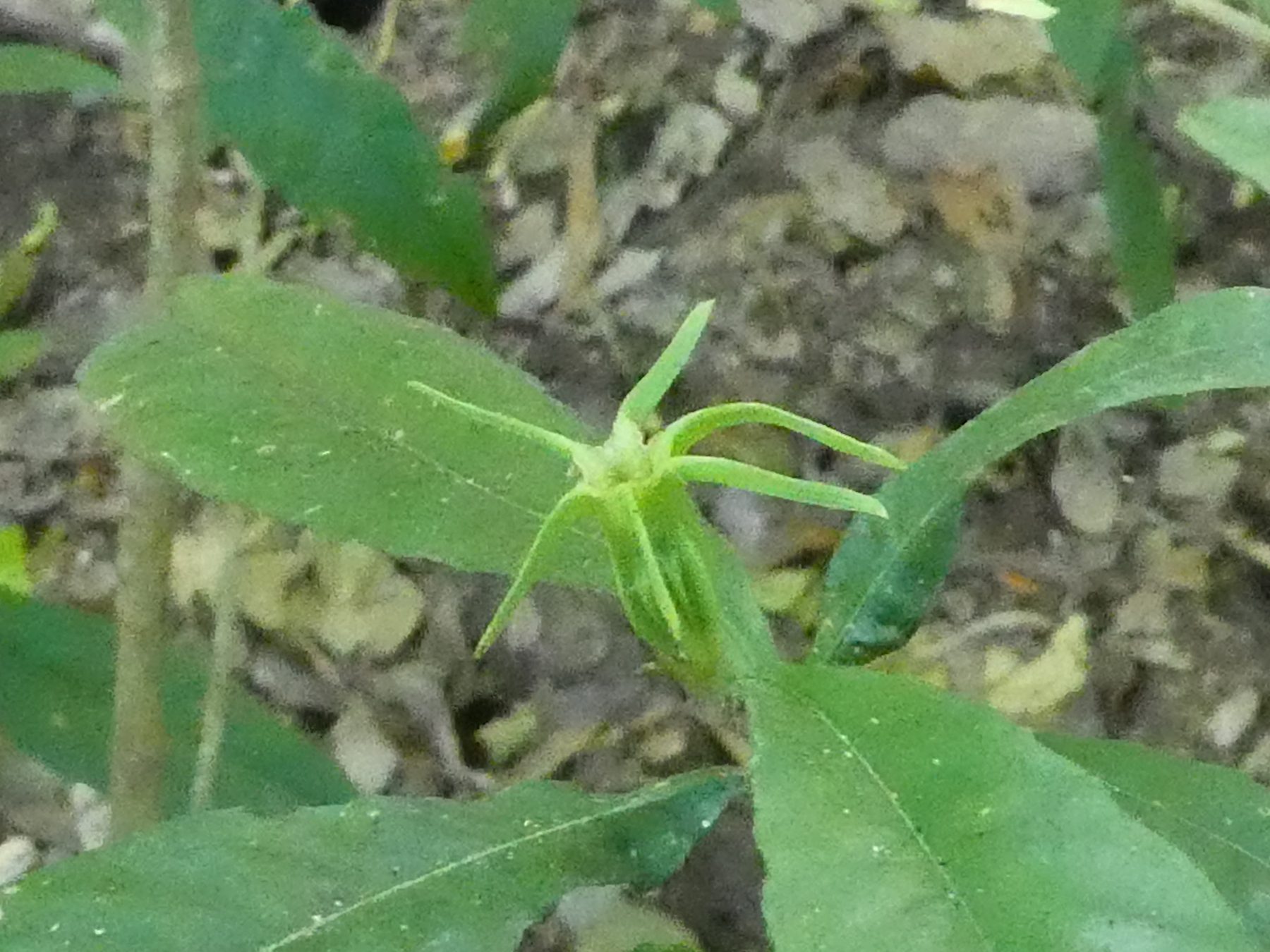
Calyx, shortly after corolla has detached
