= Gardenia sericea =

Scientific classification
- Kingdom: Plantae
- Clade: Tracheophytes
- Clade: Angiosperms
- Clade: Eudicots
- Clade: Asterids
- Order: Gentianales
- Family: Rubiaceae
- Genus: Gardenia
- Species: G. sericea

Binomial name
- Gardenia sericea Puttock

Species of plant

Gardenia sericea is a species of plant in the family Rubiaceae native to northern Australia.
