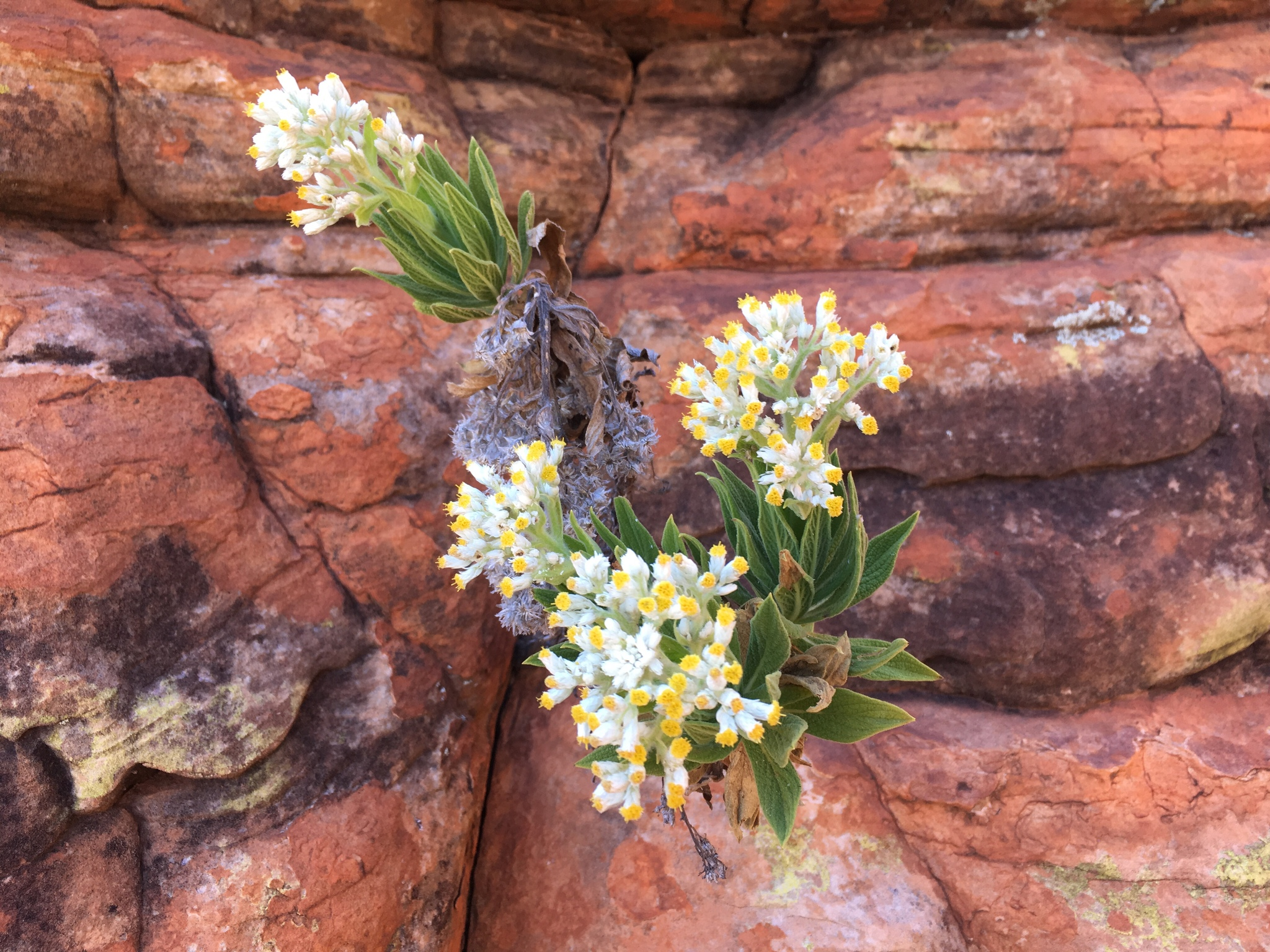
- Species of flowering plant

Scientific classification
- Kingdom: Plantae
- Clade: Tracheophytes
- Clade: Angiosperms
- Clade: Eudicots
- Clade: Asterids
- Order: Asterales
- Family: Asteraceae
- Subfamily: Asteroideae
- Tribe: Gnaphalieae
- Genus: Cremnothamnus; Puttock
- Species: C. thomsonii

Binomial name
- Cremnothamnus thomsonii (F.Muell.) Puttock

= Cremnothamnus =

Genus of flowering plants

Cremnothamnus is a genus of flowering plants belonging to the family Asteraceae. It contains a single species, Cremnothamnus thomsonii.

Its native range is Central Australia.
