= Banksia nobilis subsp. nobilis =

Scientific classification
- Kingdom: Plantae
- Clade: Tracheophytes
- Clade: Angiosperms
- Clade: Eudicots
- Order: Proteales
- Family: Proteaceae
- Genus: Banksia
- Species: B. nobilis (Lindl.) A.R.Mast & K.R.Thiele
- Subspecies: B. n. subsp. nobilis

Trinomial name
- Banksia nobilis subsp. nobilis

Synonyms
- Dryandra nobilis Lindl. subsp. nobilis

Subspecies of shrub

Banksia nobilis subsp. nobilis is a subspecies of Banksia nobilis (golden dryandra). As an autonym, it is defined as encompassing the type material of the species. It was known as Dryandra nobilis subsp. nobilis until 2007, when Austin Mast and Kevin Thiele transferred Dryandra into Banksia. As with other members of Banksia ser. Dryandra, it is endemic to the South West Botanical Province of Western Australia.
