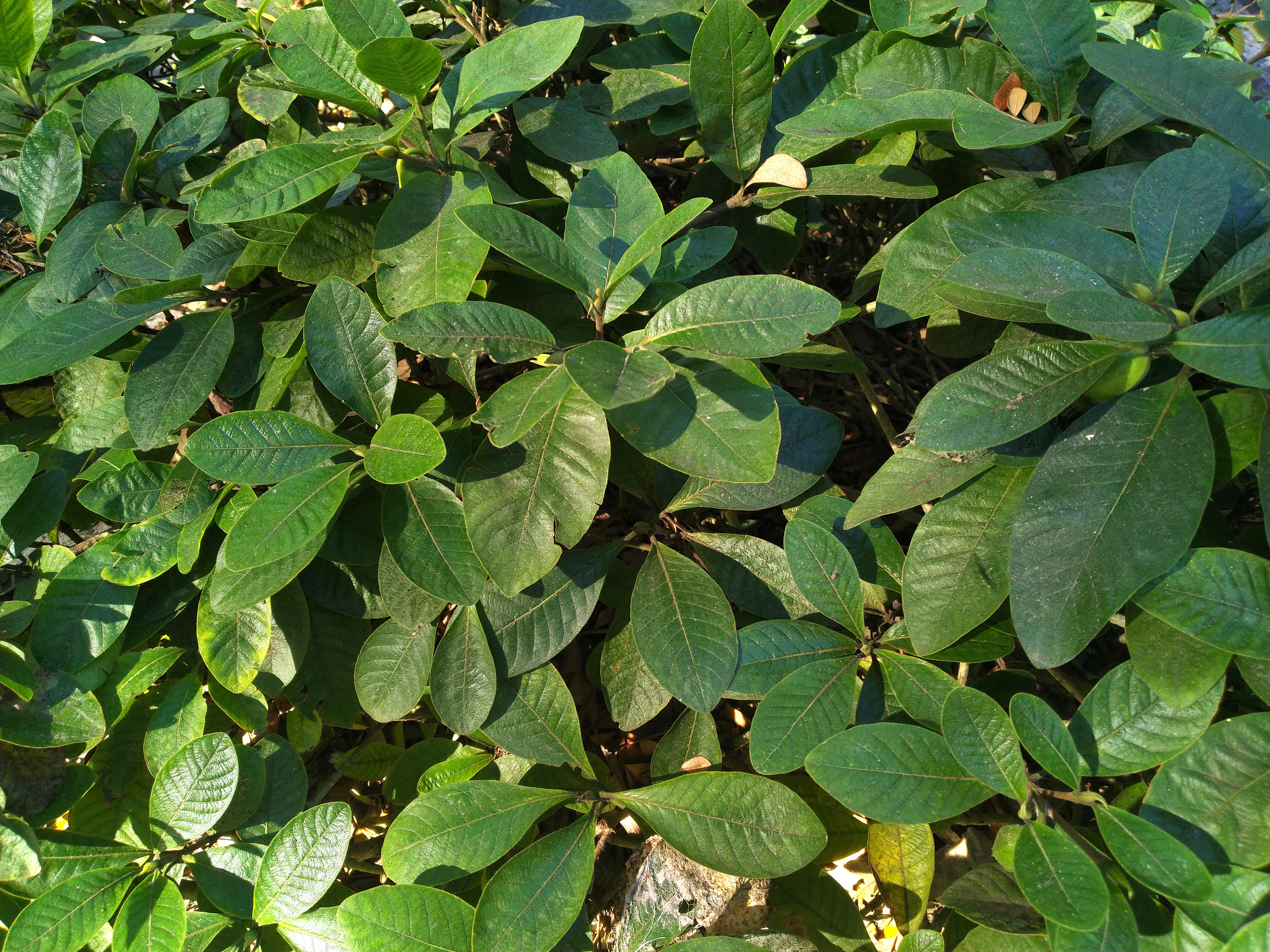
- Foliage

Conservation status
- Least Concern (IUCN 3.1)

Scientific classification
- Kingdom: Plantae
- Clade: Tracheophytes
- Clade: Angiosperms
- Clade: Eudicots
- Clade: Asterids
- Order: Gentianales
- Family: Rubiaceae
- Genus: Gardenia
- Species: G. scabrella

Binomial name
- Gardenia scabrella Puttock

= Gardenia scabrella =

- Flower

Species of plant

Habit

Gardenia scabrella is a species of plant in the family Rubiaceae. It is native to Cape York Peninsula, Queensland, and has been used in street and amenity plantings in Cairns.

== Description ==
Gardenia scabrella is a small evergreen tree to 6 m (20 ft) high. Leaves are arranged in whorls of three or sometimes in opposite pairs. They are oblanceolate to obovate and measure up to 15 cm (5.9 in) long and 5 cm (2.0 in) wide. They have a papery texture and are glossy, with a mid-green upper surface and dull light green below, rough and pointed at the apex. Flowers white-cream, solitary, terminal, buds pale green and calyx cylindrical. The fruit is a long ellipsoid shape, up to 5 cm (2.0 in) long and 2 cm (0.79 in) wide.

== Taxonomy and naming ==
Gardenia scabrella was first formally described in 1988 by Christopher Francis Puttock and the description was published in Austrobaileya. The specific epithet (scabrella) means 'rough'.

== Distribution and habitat ==
This species grows in vine thickets in areas of high rainfall north of Cape York Peninsula in Queensland.
