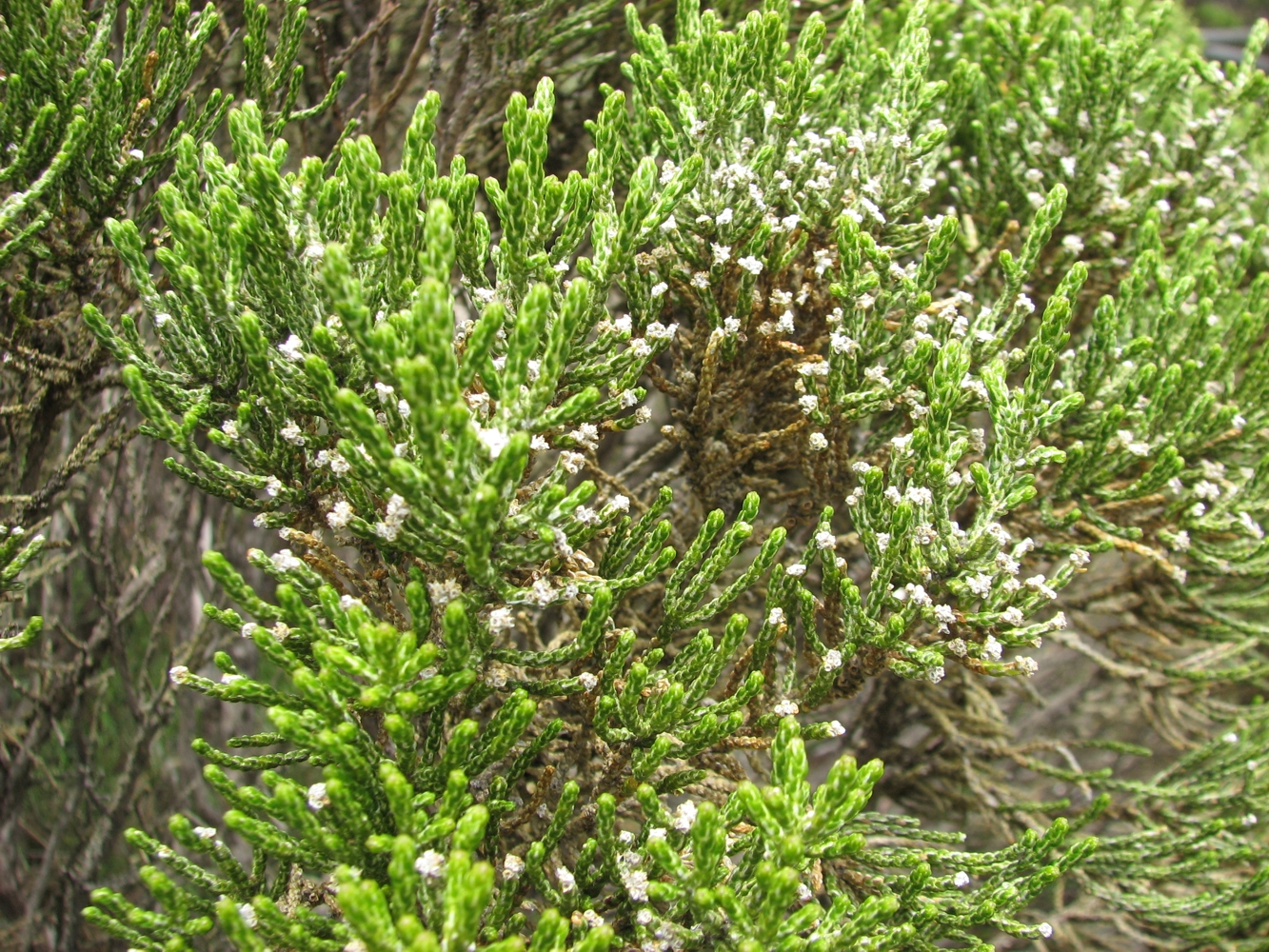
- Ozothamnus cupressoides in Baw Baw National Park, Victoria

Scientific classification
- Kingdom: Plantae
- Clade: Tracheophytes
- Clade: Angiosperms
- Clade: Eudicots
- Clade: Asterids
- Order: Asterales
- Family: Asteraceae
- Genus: Ozothamnus
- Species: O. cupressoides

Binomial name
- Ozothamnus cupressoides Puttock & D.J.Ohlsen

Synonyms
- Ozothamnus sp. 1; Ozothamnus sp. (aff. hookeri)

= Ozothamnus cupressoides =

Species of shrub

Ozothamnus cupressoides is an aromatic shrub species, endemic to Australia. Common names include scaly everlasting, lattice everlasting or kerosene bush. It grows to between 0.5 and 1 metre in height and has white-tomentose branchlets. The scale-like leaves are 1 to 3 mm long and 0.5 to 1 mm wide. These are green on the upper surface, and white tomentose below. The flower heads appear in dense clusters in summer and autumn The species occurs in boggy sites and subalpine heathland in New South Wales and Victoria. It was first formally described in 2010 in the journal Muelleria.
