= Christopher Francis Puttock =

Australian botanist

- Born: 1954 (age 71–72)
- Citizenship: Australia
- Education: University of New South Wales
- Scientific career
- Fields: Botany
- Author abbrev. (botany): Puttock

Christopher Francis Puttock (born 1954), often cited as C.F.Puttock, is an Australian botanist and taxonomist who has interests in the Rubiaceae and Asteraceae flowering plant families as well as Pteridophyta (ferns) and Rhodophyta (red algae).

== Career ==
Puttock has done field work in Australia, Malaysia, Sri Lanka and South Africa, and museum studies in Hawaii, the mainland United States, Europe, Australia and Asia.

He has held the following positions:

- Research assistant, Macquarie University, Sydney, NSW (1978–1979).
- Research assistant, (Electron Microscopist), Sydney University, Sydney, NSW (1979–1981).
- Technical officer, University of NSW, Sydney, NSW (1981–1988).
- Senior technical officer, University of NSW, Sydney, NSW (1988–1992).
- Research scientist. Australian Nature Conservation Agency (now known as Parks Australia), Canberra, ACT (1992-?).
- Research associate, Smithsonian Institution.

== Selected publications ==
- Puttock, C.F.; Quinn, C.J. (1980). "Perispore morphology and the taxonomy of the Australian Aspleniaceae". Australian Journal of Botany. 28 (3). CSIRO: 305–322. doi:10.1071/BT9800305.
- Puttock, C.F. (1988). "A Revision of Gardenia Ellis (Rubiaceae) from north-eastern Queensland". Austrobaileya. 2 (5). Brisbane: Queensland Herbarium: 433–449. doi:10.5962/p.365726. JSTOR 41738712. S2CID 260273867.
- King, R.J.; Puttock, C.F. (1989). "Morphological and taxonomy of Bostrychia and Stictosiphonia (Rhodomelaceae/Rhodophyta)". Australian Systematic Botany. 2 (1). CSIRO: 1–73. doi:10.1071/SB9890001.
- Puttock, C.F. (1994). "The morphology and generic position of Australian Kailarsenia Tirveng. (Rubiaceae: Gardenieae)". Nordic Journal of Botany. 14 (5): 515–526. doi:10.1111/j.1756-1051.1994.tb00645.x.
- Puttock, C.F. (1996). "A revision of Gardenia Ellis (Rubiaceae) from north and north-western Australia". Nuytsia. 11 (1): 225–262. doi:10.58828/nuy00265. S2CID 257676316.

== Legacy ==
C.F. Puttock is the authority for 47 taxa. Following is a list of existing Wikipedia articles as of May 2021. For a comprehensive list of all taxa authored by Puttock, see his profile at IPNI.

- Atractocarpus benthamianus
- Atractocarpus chartaceus
- Atractocarpus fitzalanii
- Atractocarpus hirtus
- Atractocarpus stipularis
- Cremnothamnus
- Gardenia actinocarpa
- Gardenia dacryoides
- Gardenia ewartii
- Gardenia gardneri
- Gardenia jabiluka
- Gardenia kakaduensis
- Gardenia psidioides
- Gardenia pyriformis
- Gardenia scabrella
- Gardenia sericea
- Ozothamnus cupressoides
