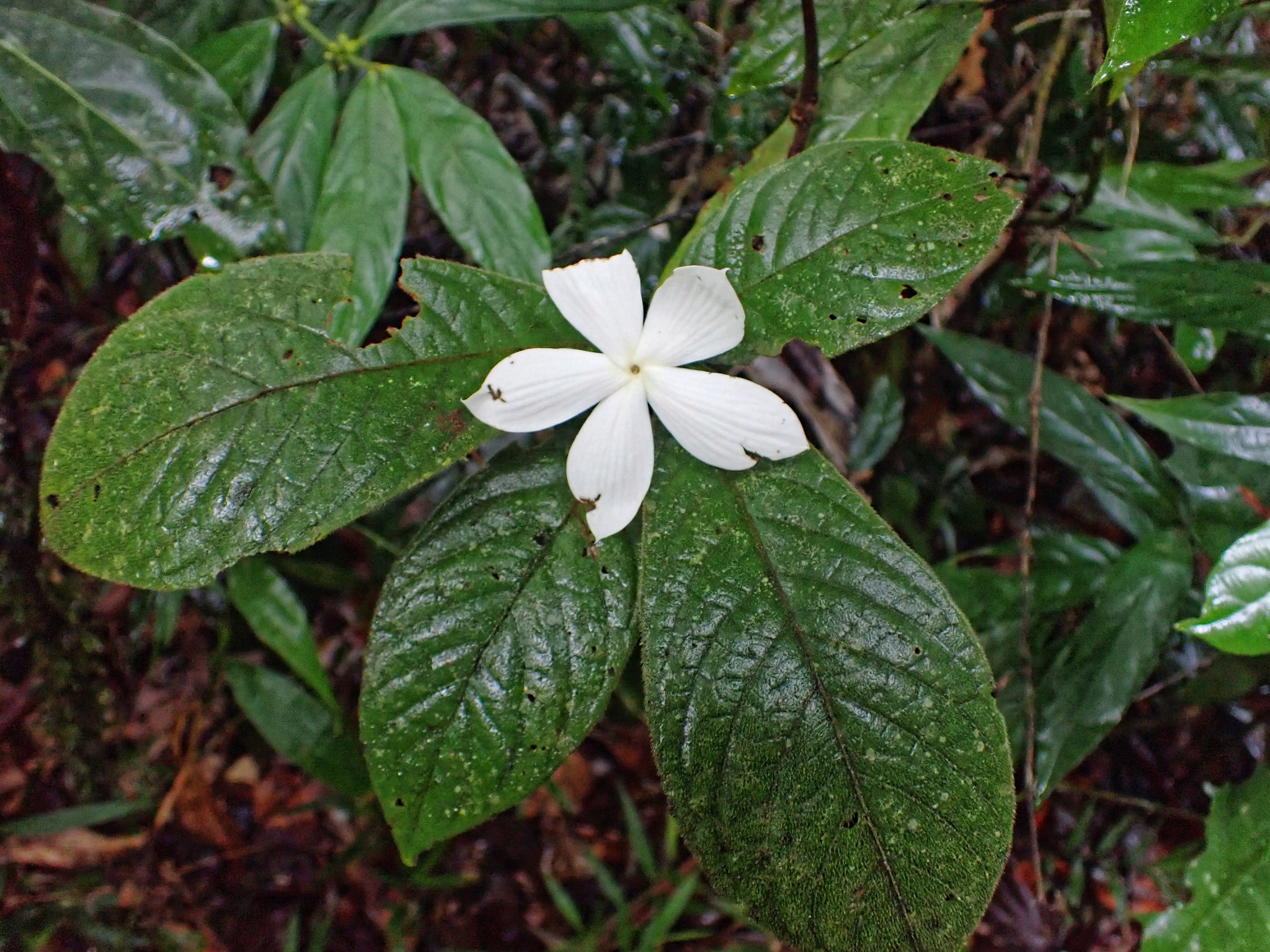

Conservation status
- Least Concern (IUCN 3.1)
- Least Concern (NCA)

Scientific classification
- Kingdom: Plantae
- Clade: Embryophytes
- Clade: Tracheophytes
- Clade: Angiosperms
- Clade: Eudicots
- Clade: Asterids
- Order: Gentianales
- Family: Rubiaceae
- Genus: Atractocarpus
- Species: A. hirtus

Binomial name
- Atractocarpus hirtus (F.Muell.) Puttock
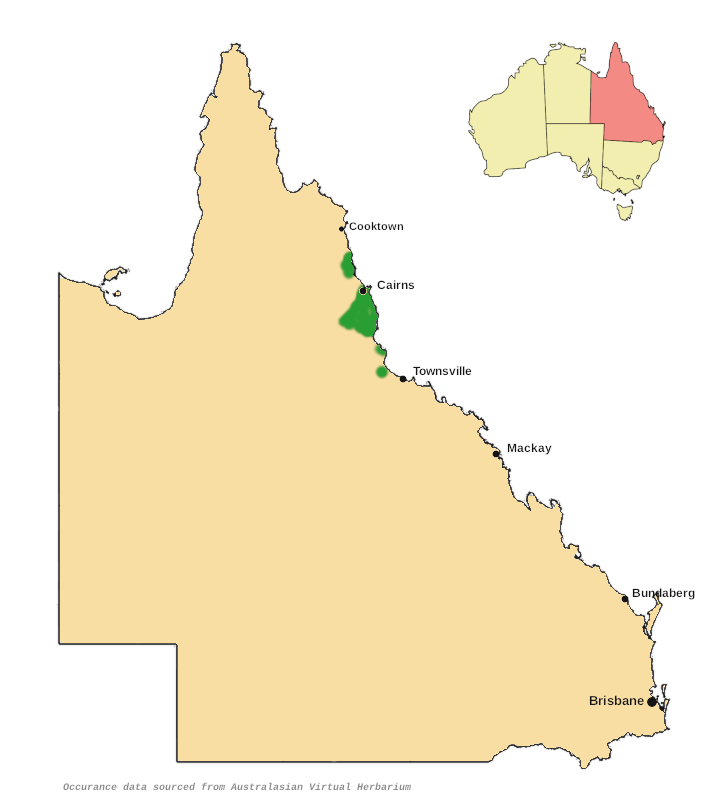

Synonyms
- Gardenia hirta F.Muell.; Randia hirta (F.Muell.) F.Muell.; Rothmannia hirta (F.Muell.) Fagerl.

= Atractocarpus hirtus =

Hairy gardenia

Species of flowering plant

Atractocarpus hirtus, commonly known as the hairy gardenia or native loquat, is a plant in the coffee family Rubiaceae, a large family of some 6,500 species with a cosmopolitan distribution. This species is endemic to northeastern Queensland, Australia.

== Description ==
The hairy gardenia is a straggly, woody, rainforest shrub growing up to 4 or 5 m (13 or 16 ft) tall. The stems, leaves and fruits are densely covered in soft hairs, hence the common name. Stipules are present and are around 13 mm (0.51 in) long. The lanceolate leaves are simple and opposite or 3-4 whorled, measuring around 18 cm (7.1 in) long by 5 cm (2.0 in) wide, dark green, and have between 11 and 14 lateral veins on either side of the midrib.

Flowers are pentamerous and actinomorphic, quite fragrant and borne in small terminal groups. The green calyx tube is about 30 mm (1.2 in) long with lobes reduced to small teeth. The corolla is white, the corolla tube is 25–30 mm (0.98–1.18 in) long with five lobes (petals) measuring 20–30 mm (0.79–1.18 in) in length. The anthers, which do not extend beyond the corolla tube, measure about 6–9 mm (0.24–0.35 in) long; the pistil about 20–25 mm (0.79–0.98 in) long.

This species is gynodioecious, that is, individual plants are either female or hermaphroditic.

The fruits of this plant are a densely hairy drupe, somewhat pear-shaped and measuring about 20 mm (0.79 in) in diameter by 30 to 50 mm (1.2 to 2.0 in) long, including the attached calyx tube. The body of the fruit is orange and the calyx tube is green. They contain numerous seeds about 7 mm (0.28 in) long immersed in an orange pulp.

Flowering occurs from May to November, and fruits ripen from December to August.

== Taxonomy ==
Atractocarpus hirtus was first described as Gardenia hirta in 1869 by Ferdinand von Mueller in his work Fragmenta Phytographiae Australiae (vol. 7), from a specimen collected in 1867 by John Dallachy near the Tully River (then known as the Mackay River). Mueller later transferred it to the genus Randia in his publication Systematic Census of Australian Plants of 1882.

In a 1999 revision of the Australian species of Gardenia and Randia, published in Australian Systematic Botany, the Australian botanist C.F. Puttock reassigned this species and gave it the current combination Atractocarpus hirtus.

=== Etymology ===
The genus name Atractocarpus is derived from the Ancient Greek terms átraktos, meaning "spindle", and karpós meaning "fruit", and refers to the spindle-shaped fruit of the type species. The species epithet hirtus is a Latin word meaning "hairy".

== Distribution and habitat ==
This species is endemic to a small part of the World Heritage listed Wet Tropics of Queensland, with a range extending from Cape Tribulation in the north to Hinchinbrook Island in the south. The altitudinal range is from sea level to around 1,000 m (3,300 ft).

== Conservation ==
Atractocarpus hirtus is listed as least concern by both the IUCN and the Queensland Government's Department of Environment and Science.

== Gallery ==
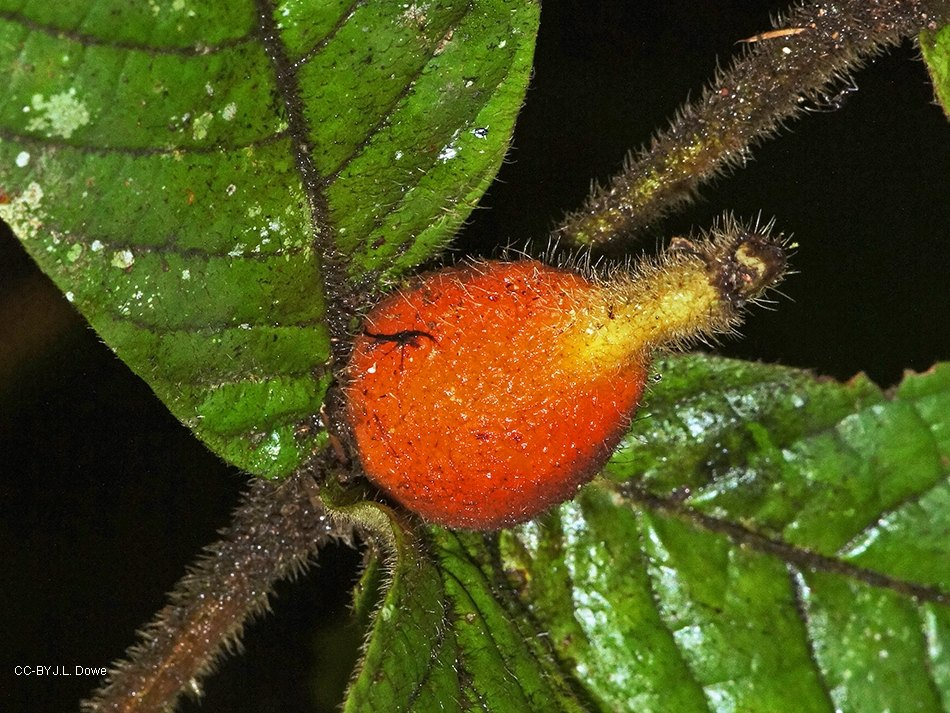
Fruit

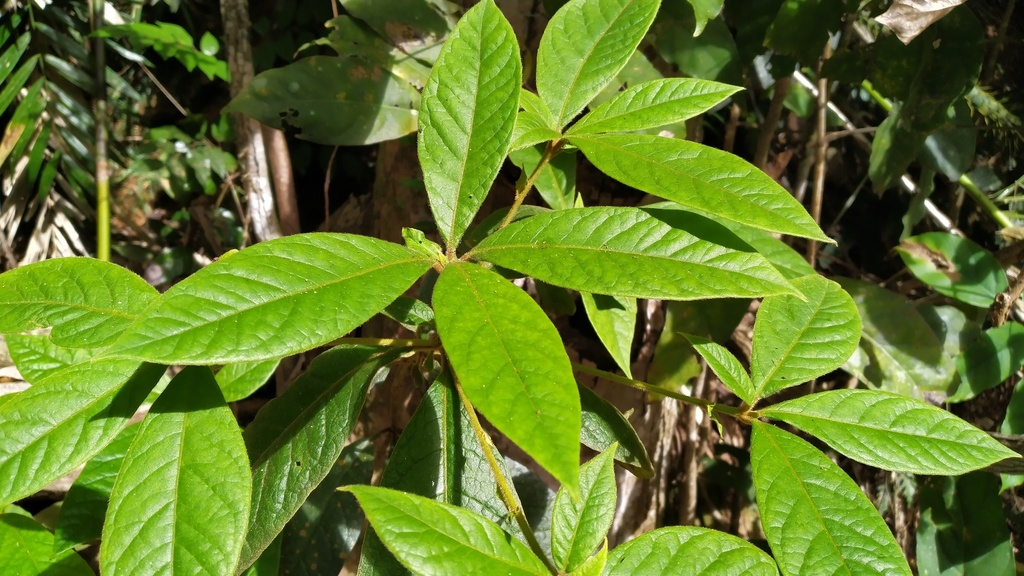
Foliage

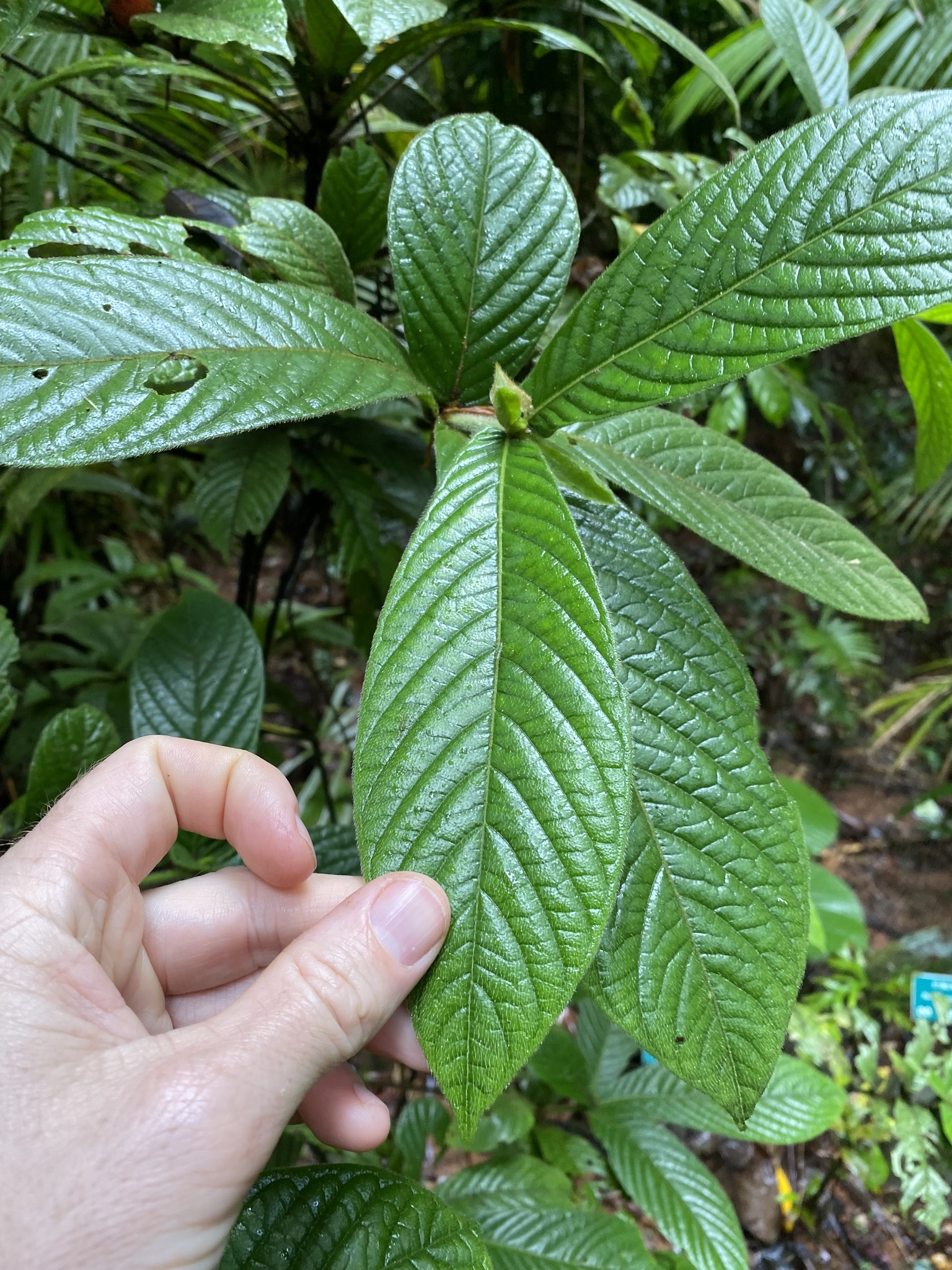

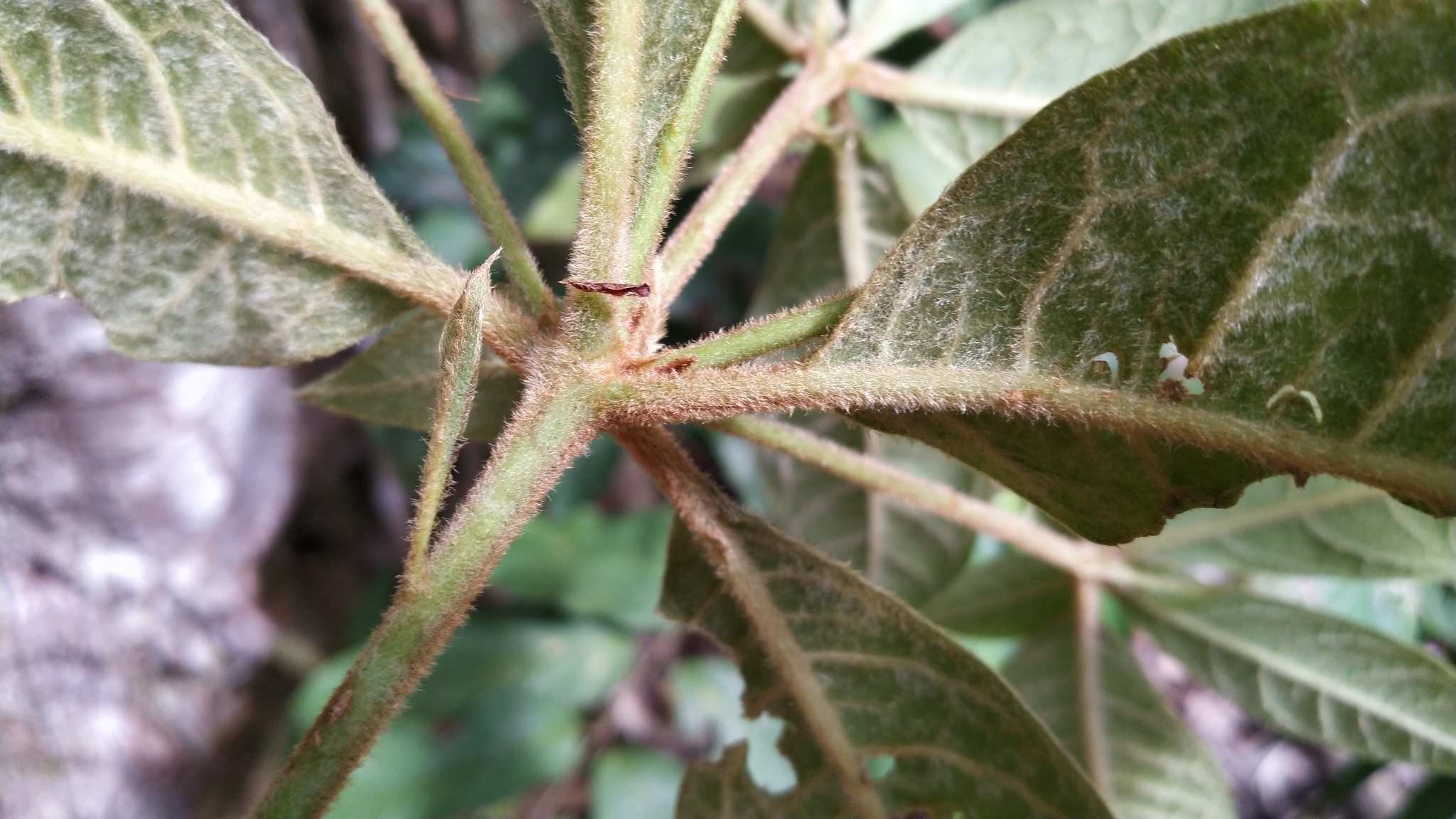
Underside of foliage
