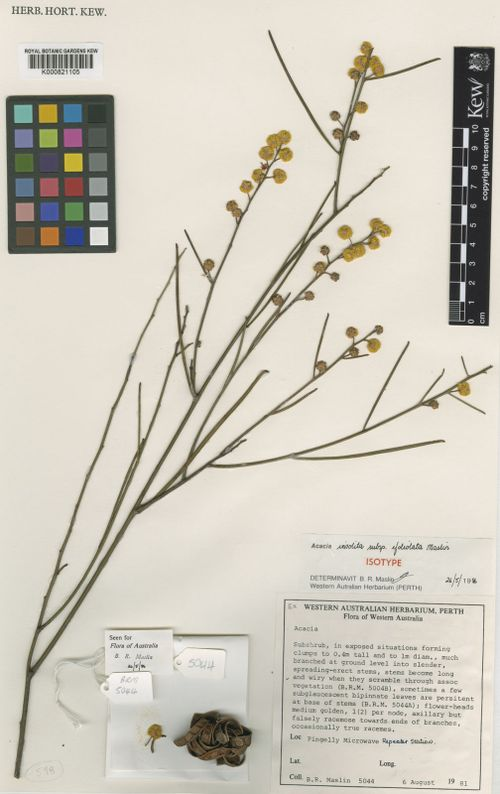
- Isotype in the Royal Botanic Gardens, Kew

Conservation status
- Priority Three — Poorly Known Taxa (DEC)

Scientific classification
- Kingdom: Plantae
- Clade: Embryophytes
- Clade: Tracheophytes
- Clade: Spermatophytes
- Clade: Angiosperms
- Clade: Eudicots
- Clade: Rosids
- Order: Fabales
- Family: Fabaceae
- Subfamily: Caesalpinioideae
- Clade: Mimosoid clade
- Genus: Acacia
- Species: A. adjutrices

Binomial name
- Acacia adjutrices Maslin

Synonyms
- Acacia insolita subsp. efoliatum Pedley orth. var.; Acacia insolita subsp. efoliolata Maslin; Racosperma insolitum subsp. efoliolatum (Maslin) Pedley

= Acacia adjutrices =

Species of legume

Acacia adjutrices, commonly known as convivial wattle, is a species of flowering plant in the family Fabaceae and is endemic to a few places in the south-west of Western Australia. It is a small, multi-stemmed shrub with thin stems, mostly linear, ascending to erect phyllodes, flowers arranged in up to 4 spherical heads of golden yellow flowers, and crust-like, linear to narrowly oblong pods.

== Description ==
Acacia adjutrices is a multi-stemmed shrub that typically grows to a height of 30–70 cm (12–28 in) high. Its phyllodes are mostly ascending to erect, glabrous, linear, 50–150 mm (2.0–5.9 in) long and usually 0.8–2 mm (0.031–0.079 in) wide with a prominent mid-rib. Sometimes a few bipinnate leaves are present at the base of the plant. The flowers are arranged in spherical heads on peduncles 4–10 mm (0.16–0.39 in) long, each heads containing 11 to 19 golden-yellow flowers. Flowering occurs in July and August and the pods are crust-like, straight and linear to narrowly oblong, 30–60 mm (1.2–2.4 in) long and 4.0–4.5 mm (0.16–0.18 in) wide containing shiny black seeds 3–4 mm (0.12–0.16 in) long with an aril on the end.

== Taxonomy ==
This species was first formally described in 1999 by Bruce Maslin who gave it the name Acacia insolita subsp. efoliata in the journal Nuytsia from specimens he collected near the Pingelly Microwave Repeater Station in 1981. In 2014, Maslin raised the subspecies to species status as Acacia adjutrices in a later edition of the same journal. The specific epithet (adjutrices) means "a female helper", referring to Susan (Sue) Carroll, Meriel Falconer, Evelyn McGough and Kaye Veryard, for their work in herbarium databases.

== Distribution and habitat ==
Convivial wattle grows on laterite hills in sandplain scrub, usually with Eucalyptus wandoo, in a few scattered location near Pingelly and Brookton in the Avon Wheatbelt and Jarrah Forest bioregions of south-western Western Australia.

== Conservation status ==
Acacia adjutrices is classified as "Priority Three" by the Government of Western Australia Department of Biodiversity, Conservation and Attractions, meaning that it is poorly known and known from only a few locations but is not under imminent threat.

== See also ==
- List of Acacia species
