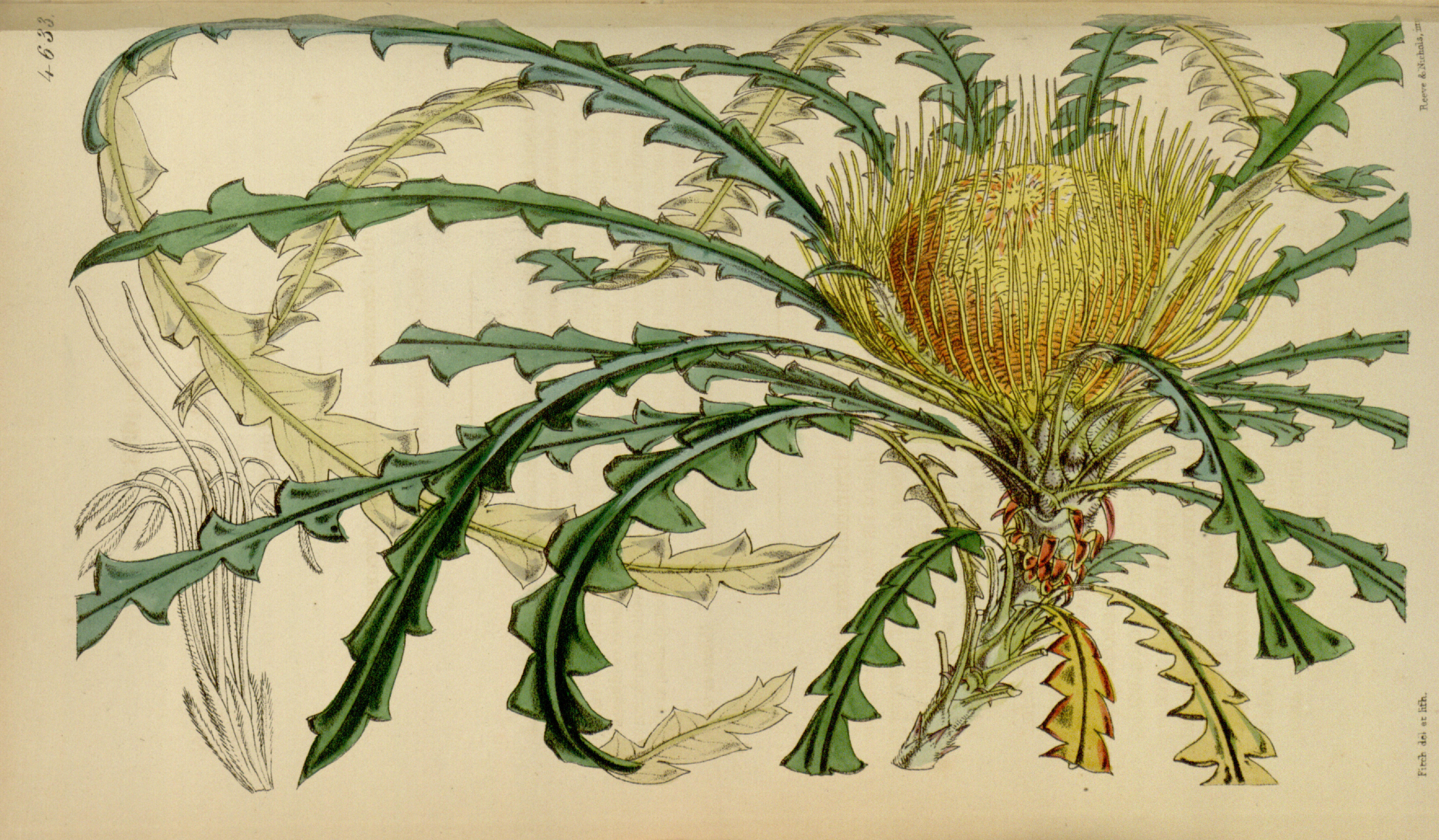
- Plate 4633 of Curtis's Botanical Magazine by Walter Hood Fitch

Conservation status
- Least Concern (IUCN 3.1)

Scientific classification
- Kingdom: Plantae
- Clade: Tracheophytes
- Clade: Angiosperms
- Clade: Eudicots
- Order: Proteales
- Family: Proteaceae
- Genus: Banksia
- Subgenus: Banksia subg. Banksia
- Series: Banksia ser. Dryandra
- Species: B. nobilis

Binomial name
- Banksia nobilis (Lindl.) A.R.Mast & K.R.Thiele
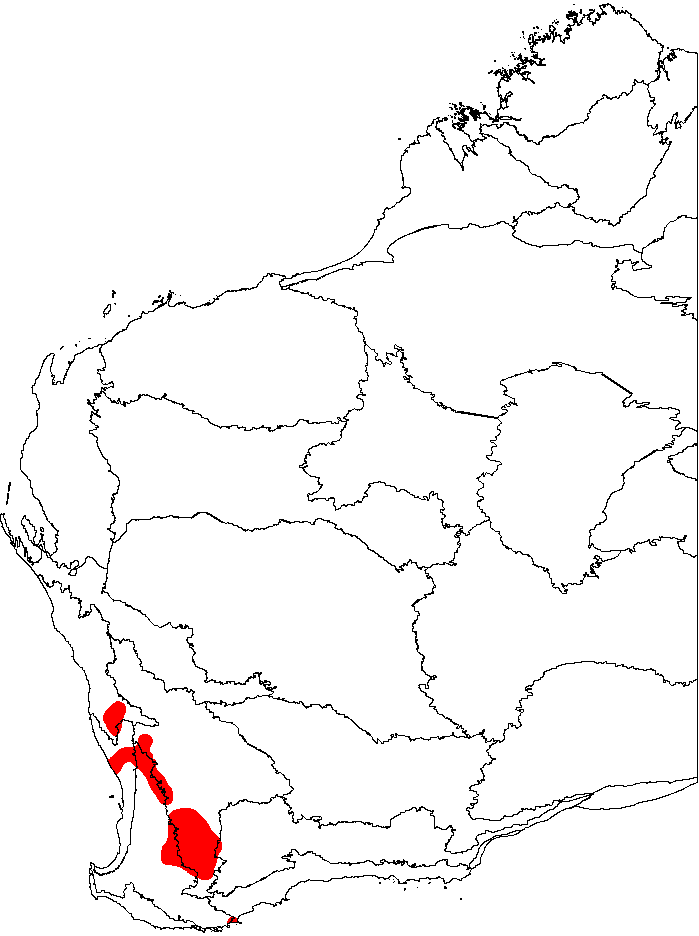
- Distribution of B. nobilis

Synonyms
- Dryandra nobilis Lindl.

= Banksia nobilis =

Golden dryandra

Species of shrub in Western Australia

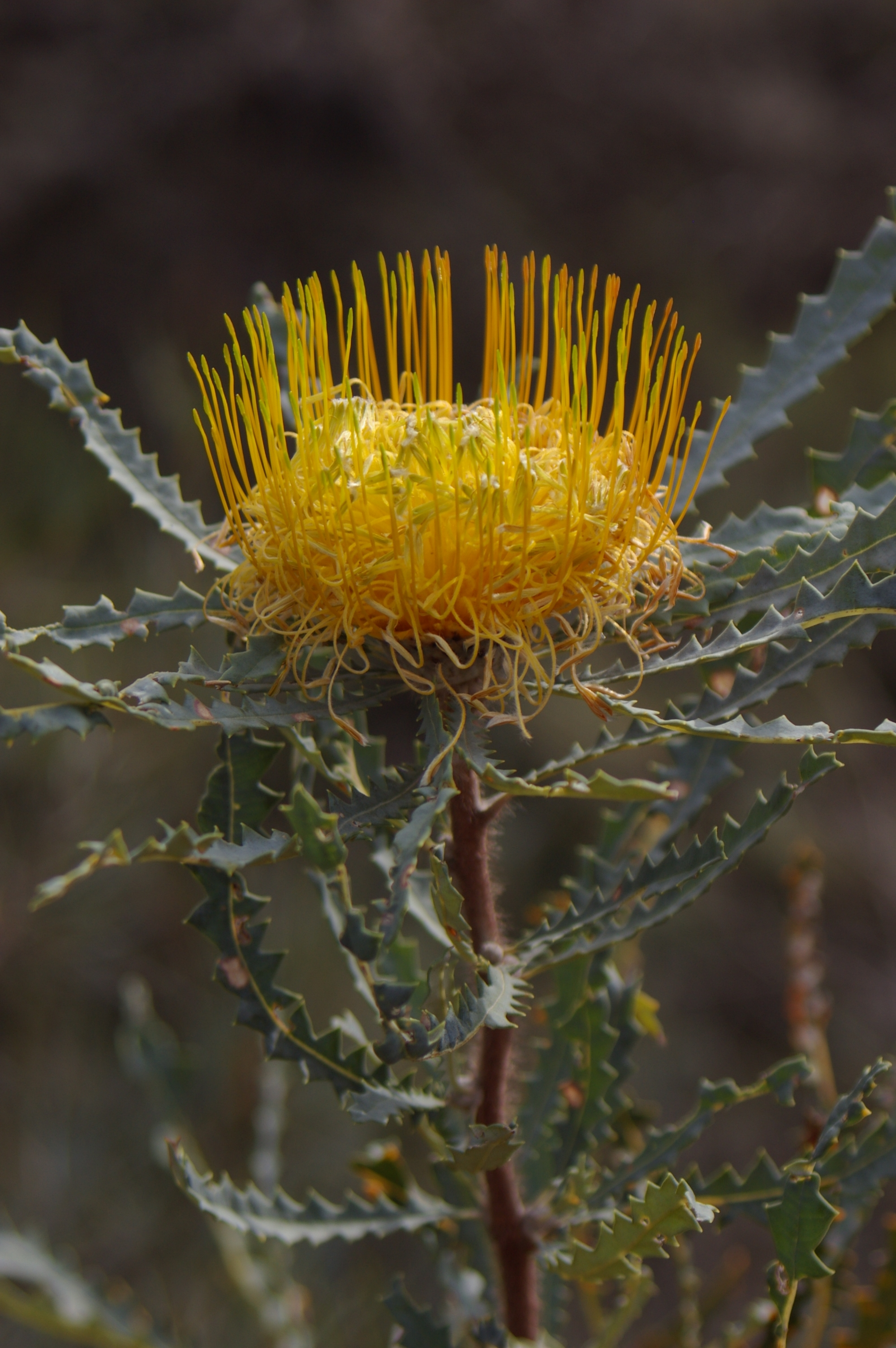

Banksia nobilis, commonly known as the golden dryandra, great dryandra or kerosene bush, is a shrub of the family Proteaceae which is endemic to Western Australia. It occurs on lateritic rises from Eneabba to Katanning in the state's Southwest Botanic Province. With large pinnatifid leaves with triangular lobes, and a golden or reddish pink inflorescence, it is a popular garden plant. It was known as Dryandra nobilis until 2007, when all Dryandra species were transferred to Banksia by Austin Mast and Kevin Thiele. There are two subspecies, B. nobilis subsp. nobilis and B. nobilis subsp. fragrans.

== Description ==
Banksia nobilis grows as a shrub up to four metres high. Its leaves are pinnatifid, with 14 to 32 triangular lobes on each side from eight to 22 centimetres long, five to 25 millimetres wide, on a petiole five to 15 millimetres long. Inflorescences occur on short lateral branchlets; this species bears a great many inflorescences, often carrying an inflorescence in almost every axil. Flowers are golden or reddish pink, with a greenish cream limb. After flowering, heads can bear up to 5 follicles each.

== Taxonomy ==
Specimens of B. nobilis were first collected in the 1830s by James Drummond from the vicinity of the Swan River Colony. The species was published under the name Dryandra nobilis by John Lindley in his 1840 A Sketch of the Vegetation of the Swan River Colony, where he referred to it as "a most splendid plant in the way of D. longifolia and tenuifolia, with leaves from a foot to a foot and half long". Lindley did not specify his type material, and there is no type at the University of Cambridge Herbarium, where most of Lindley's type specimens are lodged. However most of A Sketch of the Vegetation of the Swan River Colony is based upon the collections of Drummond, and one of Drummond's specimens has since been selected as lectotype for the species. Lindley also proffered no etymology for the specific epithet, but it is accepted that it comes from the Latin nobilis ("noble, imposing") in reference to the purportedly noble appearance of the plant.

In addition to plant specimens, Drummond also sent seeds of D. nobilis to England. Plants were raised from Drummond's seeds, and in 1852 one of them flowered, making D. nobilis one of only two dryandras known to have flowered in Europe from Drummond's seed. The flowering specimen was about seven years old at the time, and about four feet high. It became the basis for a lithographed plate by Walter Hood Fitch, which was featured in Volume 78 of Curtis's Botanical Magazine. By this time, however, the enthusiasm for Proteaceae that prevailed among horticulturalists in the 1840s had waned, and D. nobilis would be the last dryandra to feature in Curtis's Botanical Magazine.

Text accompanying Fitch's plate by William Jackson Hooker suggested that Carl Meissner considered their specimen to be the then unpublished species Dryandra runcinata, but this was a mis-identification: D. runcinata is now considered a synonym of Banksia squarrosa rather than this species.

The species has had a fairly uneventful taxonomic history since publication, with only three events of taxonomic interest since publication. In 1891, Otto Kuntze made an unsuccessful attempt to transfer the genus Dryandra into the name Josephia, in the process publishing the name Josephia nobilis for this species. That name is now considered a nomenclatural synonym of B. nobilis. In 1996 Alex George published a subspecies, D. nobilis subsp. fragrans (now B. nobilis subsp. fragrans), therefore also invoking the autonym D. nobilis subsp. nobilis (now B. nobilis subsp. nobilis) to encompass the type material. Finally, in 2007 the genus Dryandra was transferred into Banksia by Austin Mast and Kevin Thiele, resulting in the publication of the current name for this species, Banksia nobilis (Lindl.) A.R.Mast & K.R.Thiele.

== Distribution and habitat ==
Banksia nobilis occurs on lateritic rises from Eneabba in the north to Katanning in the south. Much of its distribution roughly follows the boundary between the Jarrah Forest and Avon Wheatbelt biogeographic regions, but at its northern limits it extends into the Swan Coastal Plain and Geraldton Sandplains. For most of its range it grows in eucalypt woodland and tall shrubland, but at its northern extents it grows among thick kwongan.

== Conservation ==
Banksia nobilis subsp. nobilis is not currently endangered, and is currently exploited in the wild by the cut flower industry. Banksia nobilis subsp. fragrans has been listed as Priority Three - Poorly Known Taxa on the Western Australian Department of Environment and Conservation's Declared Rare and Priority Flora List.

An assessment of the potential impact of climate change on this species found that severe change is likely to lead to a contraction of its range by up to 80% by 2080; but under less severe change scenarios the distribution may contract slightly or even grow, depending on how effectively it can migrate into newly habitable areas.

== Cultivation ==
Banksia nobilis subsp. nobilis has long been a popular garden plant because of its prolific flowering. It prefers heavy, gravelly soil with excellent drainage, in a sunny position. It is drought tolerant, and frost tolerant down to −7 °C. Plants become straggly and untidy with age, so should be pruned when young. Propagation is by seed, as the hairy stems of this plant make it virtually impossible to strike stem cuttings, and heel cuttings have been met with limited success. Germination takes three to four weeks, and has an excellent success rate. Flowering usually begins at three to four years from seed.

Banksia nobilis subsp. fragrans is new to cultivation and there is little information available for it. It probably requires a similar aspect to subspecies nobilis, but would be better suited to warmer areas.
