= Laughlin =

Laughlin may refer to:

== Places ==
- Laughlin, Nevada
- Laughlin Air Force Base
- Laughlin (Nevada gaming area)

== Other uses ==
- Laughlin (surname)
- Laughlin City, a fictional town in Alberta, Canada in the 2000 movie X-Men
- Laughlin wavefunction, an ansatz for the ground state of a two-dimensional electron gas (physics)
- Homer Laughlin China Company

== See also ==
- Lachlan (disambiguation)
- Lochlann
- McLaughlin (disambiguation)
- Loughlin
- Laflin, Pennsylvania
- Fordyce L. Laflin
