= O'Laughlin =

O'Laughlin is an Irish surname. Notable people with the surname include:

- Cindy O'Laughlin, American politician and member of the Missouri Senate
- Jeanne O'Laughlin (1929–2019), co-founder of Barry University in Florida, USA
- John Callan O'Laughlin (1873–1949), publisher of the Army and Navy Journal

== See also ==
- Ó Lochlainn
- O'Loughlin
