= McLaughlin =

McLaughlin may refer to:

- McLaughlin (surname), an Irish surname

== Places ==
=== Canada ===
- Adelaide McLaughlin Public School, an elementary school in Oshawa, Ontario, Canada
- McLaughlin Planetarium, a former working planetarium immediately to the south of the Royal Ontario Museum in Toronto
- R S McLaughlin Collegiate and Vocational Institute, in Oshawa, Ontario, Canada

=== Outer space ===
- McLaughlin (lunar crater), located just behind the northwestern rim on the far side of the Moon
- McLaughlin (Martian crater)
- 2024 McLaughlin, an asteroid discovered at Goethe Link Observatory by the Indiana Asteroid Program
- 4838 Billmclaughlin minor planet discovered at Palomar

=== United States ===
- McLaughlin, South Dakota, a city in Corson County, South Dakota
- Bishop McLaughlin Catholic High School, a private, Roman Catholic high school in Hudson, Florida
- Charles D. McLaughlin House, located at 507 South 38th Street in the Gold Coast Historic District of Midtown Omaha, Nebraska

== Other uses ==
- McLaughlin Motor Car Company, a Canadian car manufacturer later acquired by General Motors
- McLaughlin Award, an award given to the nation's most outstanding NCAA lacrosse midfielder since 1973
- McLaughlin v. Florida, a United States Supreme Court case
- McLaughlin v. Panetta, a United States lawsuit
- Rossiter–McLaughlin effect, a spectroscopic phenomenon
- The Able McLaughlins, a 1923 novel by Margaret Wilson
- The Law and the McLaughlins, a 1936 novel by Margaret Wilson
- The McLaughlin Group, a syndicated half-hour weekly public affairs television program in the United States
