= John Farris (disambiguation) =

John Farris (born 1936) is an American novelist, screenwriter, and playwright.

John Farris may also refer to:

- John Farris (American football) (born 1940), American football player
- John Farris (poet and novelist) (1940–2016), American poet and novelist
- John Wallace de Beque Farris (1878–1970), Canadian lawyer and politician
- John Lauchlan Farris (1911–1986), Canadian lawyer and judge, son of the above
