= Lauchlan =

Lauchlan is both a surname and a given name. Notable people with the name include:

Surname

- Agnes Lauchlan (1905–1993), British stage, film and television actress
- Bill Lauchlan (1916–2009), Scottish communist activist
- Doug Lauchlan, Canadian politician, minister and educator
- Grant Lauchlan, Scottish entertainment journalist, producer and film reporter for STV in Scotland
- Jim Lauchlan (born 1977), Scottish footballer
- Martin Lauchlan (born 1980), Scottish former professional footballer

Given name

- Lauchlan Maclean, 2nd Laird of Brolas (1650–1687), the second Laird of Brolas
- Lauchlan Dalgleish (born 1993), former professional Australian rules footballer
- John Lauchlan Farris, Q.C., (1911–1986), Canadian lawyer and judge
- Lauchlan Bellingham Mackinnon (1815–1877), Member of Parliament for Rye, Sussex, England, 1865–1868
- Lauchlan Rose, founder of Rose’s lime juice
- Lauchlan Mackinnon (1817–1888), pastoralist, politician and newspaper proprietor in colonial Australia
- Lauchlan McGillivray (died 1880), 19th-century Member of Parliament from Southland, New Zealand
- Lauchlan Watt (1867–1957), the minister of Glasgow Cathedral from 1923 to 1934

== See also ==
- Lachlan (disambiguation)
- McLauchlan
