= Loki (disambiguation) =

Loki is the god of mischief in Norse mythology.

Loki may also refer to:

== Computing ==
- LOKI, a family of cryptographic block ciphers
- Loki (C++), a C++ software library
- Loki (computer), a proposed home computer
- Loki Software, a software firm
- Loki, an open source logging platform available through Grafana

== Fictional characters ==
- Loki (Marvel Comics), a character in Marvel Comics
  - Loki (Marvel Cinematic Universe), the character adapted for the media franchise, since 2011
- Loki (Dark Horse Comics), a character in The Mask comic book series and related media
- Loki (Dogma), a character in the film Dogma
- Loki (Stargate), a character in the TV series Stargate SG-1
- Loki, a character in the manga Mythical Detective Loki Ragnarok and its derived works
- Loki, a character in the manga One Piece and its derived works
- Loki, a character in the manga Record of Ragnarok and its derived works
- Loki, a character in the light novel series Is It Wrong to Try to Pick Up Girls in a Dungeon? and its derived works

== People ==
- Loki (rapper), stage name of Darren McGarvey
- A pseudonym of British mathematician and biostatistician Karl Pearson
- Loki Schmidt, the wife of German ex-Chancellor Helmut Schmidt
- Lokesh Kanagaraj, an Indian filmmaker
  - Lokiverse, a cinematic universe created by him

== Music ==
- Loki? (album), a 1974 album by Arnaldo Baptista
- "Loki", a 2012 song by Icelandic Viking metal band Skálmöld from the album Börn Loka

== Television ==
- Loki (TV series), a 2021 Marvel series
- "Loki" (Marvel Studios: Legends), an episode of Marvel Studios: Legends

== Places ==
- Loki, Indonesia. a village on Seram Island
- Loki Patera, a volcano on Jupiter's moon Io
- Lokichogio (also called Loki), a town in northern Kenya
- Mount Loki, a mountain in British Columbia

== Other uses ==
- Loki (video game), a 2007 video game
- Loki (rocket), an American sounding rocket, later developed into the Super Loki rocket
- Loki, an isopod genus in the family Bopyridae
- Debreceni VSC, an association football club nicknamed Loki
- LoKI, a SANS (small angle neutron scattering) beamline at the European Spallation Source
- Lokiarchaeota, a former name, after the Norse god, of the family of single celled organisms now called Promethearchaeaceae
- Loki, a nickname for one of the German Karl-Gerät self-propelled siege mortar in World War II

== See also ==
- Loki7, the alias of Roger Charles Bell, a pipe-bomber and former educator from Prince Edward Island, Canada
- Loki's Castle, a field of hydrothermal vents
- Lokiarchaeota, a proposed phylum of Archaea named after Loki's Castle
- Loci, the plural of locus
- Low Ki or Brandon Silvestry a professional wrestler
- The Mythical Detective Loki Ragnarok
- Lokai, a half-white, half-black character in "Let That Be Your Last Battlefield", an episode of Star Trek
- Locchi, a surname
- Lockey, a surname
- Lockie, a surname and given name
- Lokey, a surname
