= MacLauchlan =

MacLauchlan or Maclauchlan is a surname. Notable people with this surname include:

- Henry MacLauchlan (1792–1882), a British surveyor
- Margaret Maclauchlan (died 1685), a Scottish martyr
- Wade MacLauchlan (born 1954), a Canadian law professor, university president, and politician

== See also ==
- McLauchlan, a similarly spelled surname
