= V Persei =

Nova event seen in 1887 in the constellation Perseus

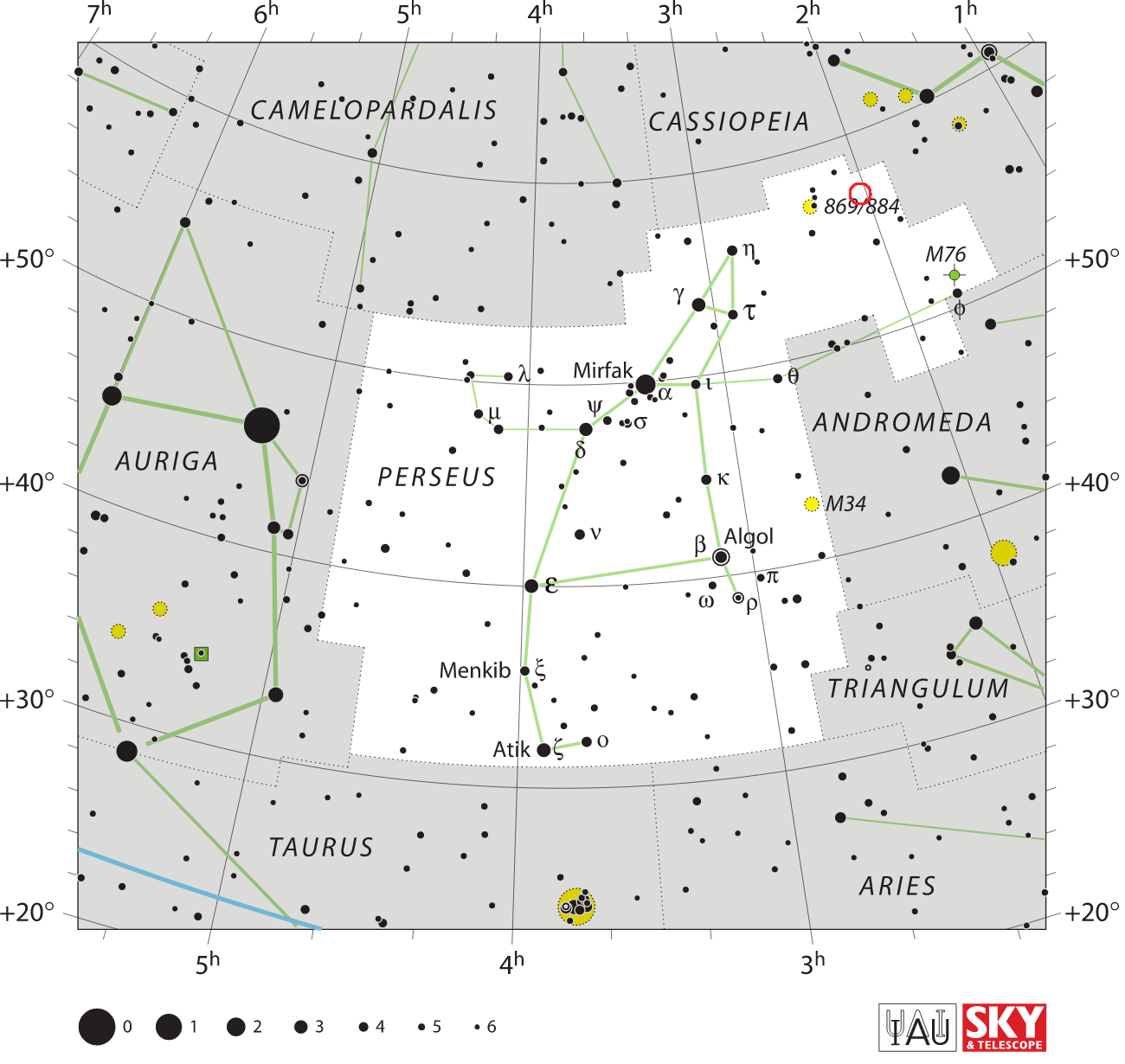
- Location of V Persei (circled in red)

Observation data Epoch J2000 Equinox ICRS
- Constellation: Perseus
- Right ascension: 02^{h} 01^{m} 53.92^{s}
- Declination: +56° 44′ 03.5″
- Apparent magnitude (V): 4? Max. 18.1 – 19.34 Min.

Characteristics
- Variable type: Classical nova + Eclipsing binary

Astrometry
Proper motion (μ)	RA: −44.184 mas/yr Dec.: −42.448 mas/yr
Parallax (π)	0.2786±0.1275 mas
Distance	≈ 1,000 pc
Absolute magnitude (M_{V})	4.6

Orbit
Period (P)	2.57 hours
Semi-major axis (a)	0.95 R_{☉}
Inclination (i)	85.4°

Details

White dwarf
Mass	0.85 M_{☉}
Radius	0.0097 R_{☉}
Temperature	10,000 K

Secondary
Mass	0.17 M_{☉}
Radius	0.24 R_{☉}
Temperature	3,300 K

Other designations
- Nova Per 1887, AAVSO 0155+56

Database references
SIMBAD	data

V Persei, also known as Nova Persei 1887, was discovered by Williamina Fleming on a Harvard College Observatory objective-prism photograph taken on 3 November 1887. It is believed to be the first nova whose spectrum was recorded. The nova had an apparent magnitude of 9.2 at the time of discovery. Judging from the consistency of the nova's brightness after discovery, and details of the spectral lines seen, McLaughlin estimated that the nova was five or six months past peak brightness at the time of its discovery, and at its peak it was almost certainly at least as bright as 4th magnitude. So V Persei was probably visible to the naked eye, though there is no record that anyone actually noticed it when that was possible. It is currently an 18th magnitude object.

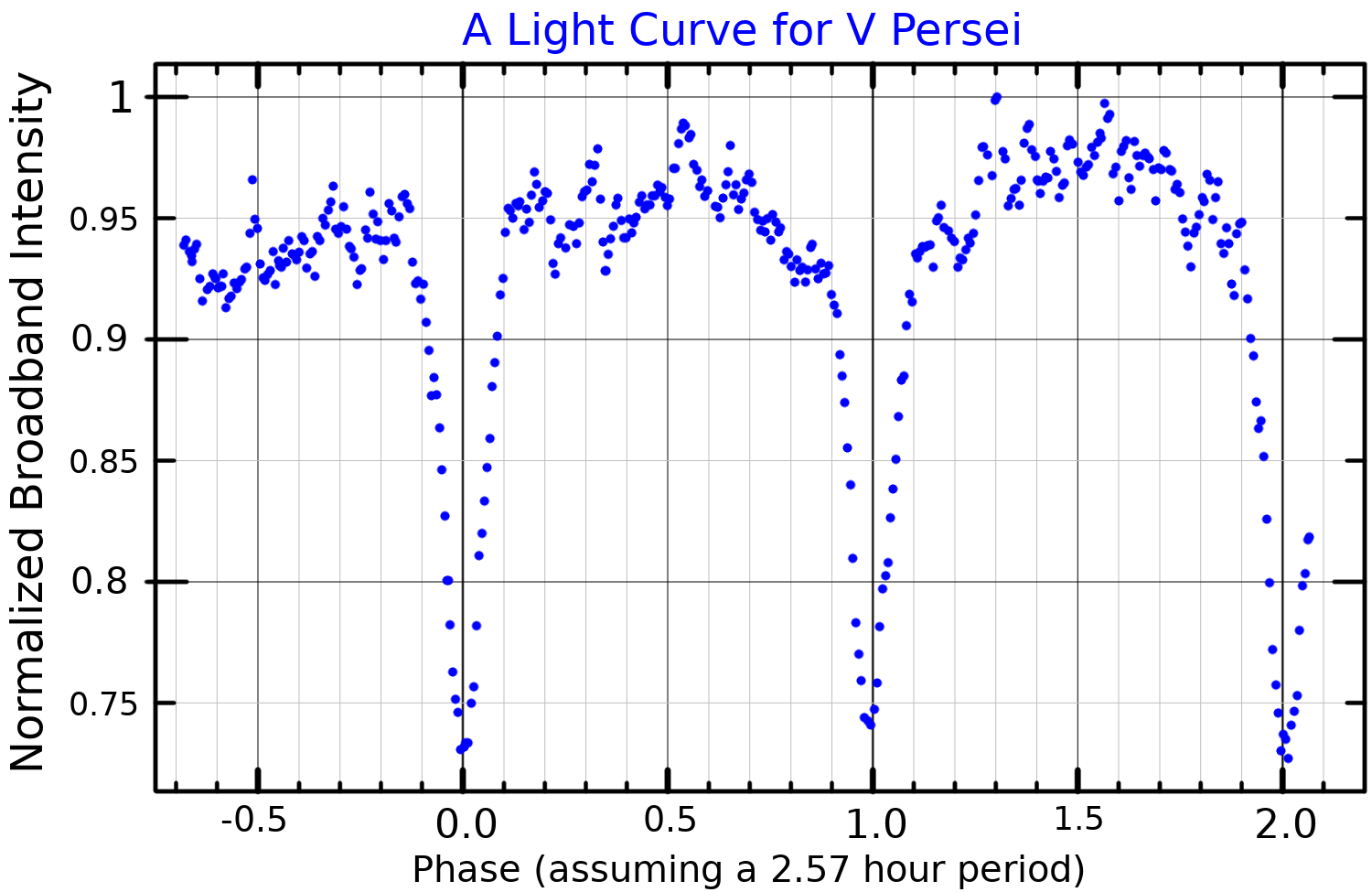
A broadband optical lightcurve for V Persei, adapted from Shafter and Abbott (1989)

All novae are binary stars, with a "donor" star orbiting so close to a white dwarf companion that matter is transferred from the donor to the white dwarf. Because the stars are so close together, novae are often eclipsing binaries, and V Persei shows such eclipses. That allows the orbital period, 2.57 hours, to be measured easily. The peak-to-peak brightness variation during the eclipse cycle is about 0.5 magnitudes. Classical novae, like V Persei, are a type of cataclysmic variable star (CV) and the orbital periods of CVs have a bimodal distribution with peaks around 1.4 and 10 hours. Few CVs have orbital periods between 2 and 3 hours. Because of this, V Persei's 2.57 hour period makes it a useful object for constraining models of CV evolution.

In 1997 the William Herschel Telescope was used to search for a resolved shell surrounding V Persei, but none was found.
