= Ó Lachtnáin =

Ó Lachtnáin was the name of as many as eight Gaelic-Irish families, located in Connacht and Munster.

The Gaelic personal name Lachtnán is derived from lachtna ("gray").

It is now found as Loughnan, Loughnane, Laughnan, Loughman, Loftus.

In the Scottish islands of Orkney, the name may be the root of the anglicised version of the name Laughton which has been recorded in records as Lachtane and Lauchtain from the 1494 kings records.

Another potential variation or indeed origin of the name Lachtnán is the Manx word "Loaghtan" which refers to the grey tinted colour described as "mouse brown". On the Isle of Man a distinctive breed of sheep is called "The Manx Loaghtan" in reference to its wool colour. The word Loaghtan is described in some sources as pronounced Lochtan and this reinforces the root word "Lachtna" meaning Grey.

== See also ==
- Lawton, within County Cork Lawton is an Anglicised form of Ó Lachtnáin.
- Lough, Anglicised form of Ó Lachtnáin.
- Loughman, Anglicised form of Ó Lachtnáin.
- Loughney, Anglicised form of Ó Lachtná.
- Loughlin, in some cases Loughlin is a variant of O'Loughlin.
- O'Loughlin
