= John Lauchlan Farris =

Canadian judge (1911–1986)

The Honourable John Lauchlan Farris

Chief Justice of British Columbia
- In office 1973–1978
- Appointed by: Pierre Trudeau
- Preceded by: Herbert William Davey
- Succeeded by: Nathan Nemetz

43rd President of the Canadian Bar Association
- In office 1971–1972
- Preceded by: A. Lorne Campbell, Q.C.
- Succeeded by: Louis-Philippe de Grandpré, Q.C.

Personal details
- Born: September 5, 1911
- Died: 1986 (age 75) Vancouver
- Spouse: Dorothy Beatrice (née Colledge)
- Relations: John Wallace de Beque Farris, Attorney General of British Columbia and Senator (father); Laughlin Farris, New Brunswick M.L.A. (grandfather); John Ferris, M.P.; New Brunswick M.L.A. (great-grandfather)
- Children: Ann, Haig, and Katherine
- Profession: Lawyer

John Lauchlan Farris (September 5, 1911 – 1986) was a Canadian lawyer and judge. He served one term as President of the Canadian Bar Association, prior to being appointed Chief Justice of British Columbia.

== Early life and family ==
Farris was the son of John Wallace de Beque Farris and Evlyn Fenwick Farris. The couple had three other children: Katherine Hay, Donald Fenwick, and Ralph Keirstead.

Farris' father, John Wallace de Beque Farris, was a well-established lawyer. He had served as Attorney General of British Columbia, President of the Law Society of British Columbia, and national President of the Canadian Bar Association.

Farris married Dorothy Beatrice Colledge. The couple had three children: Ann, Haig, and Katherine.

== Legal and judicial career ==
In 1935, Farris joined his father's law firm, which became known as Farris, Farris, Stultz, Bull & Farris (now Farris LLP). He originally practised as junior counsel to his father. He interrupted his legal career to serve overseas in World War II, returning home in 1945.

Farris established a reputation as a good advocate, particularly in appeals. He appeared several times before the Judicial Committee of the Privy Council, at that time Canada's highest appellate court.

Like his father before him, Farris was elected national President of the Canadian Bar Association, serving a one-year term from 1971 to 1972.

In 1973, Farris was appointed directly from the Bar to the position of Chief Justice of British Columbia, the highest judicial office in the Province.

== Resignation from the bench ==
In the summer of 1978, the Vancouver Police acquired evidence, including wiretap and photographs, which implicated Chief Justice Farris in dealing with prostitutes.

The matter was eventually referred to the Canadian Judicial Council, which has the power to review allegations of misconduct by judges. Shortly after the referral to the council, Chief Justice Farris submitted his letter of resignation to the federal Minister of Justice, Otto Lang. The letter stated, in part:

"Certain allegations against me (not of a criminal nature) have been referred to the Canadian Judicial Council for investigation. I consider the mere fact that these allegations have been made, regardless of their substance, have so impaired my usefulness as chief justice that it is in the public interest that I resign."

Farris was never charged with any offence in relation to the matter. He was not required to testify, as the woman in question pleaded guilty to a charge of keeping a bawdy house. She was ordered to pay a fine of $1,500 and perform 300 hours of community service.

== Later life and death ==
In 1979, a few months after his resignation, Farris re-applied to the Law Society for permission to practise as a lawyer. The Law Society granted the application. Farris joined another law firm, not the firm founded by his father, where he himself had practised for nearly forty years.

Farris died in 1986.
