= Laughlin (surname) =

The surname Laughlin (/ˈlɔːflɪn/) is an Anglicised form of the Irish Ó Lochlainn meaning "descendant of Lochlann".

== Surname ==
- Ben Laughlin (disambiguation)
- Bill Laughlin (1915–1993), American professional basketball player
- Billy Laughlin (1932–1948), American child actor
- Charles Laughlin (born 1938), American neuroanthropologist
- Craig Laughlin (born 1957), Canadian ice hockey player
- Don Laughlin (1931–2023), American casino entrepreneur
- Edward E. Laughlin (1887–1952), American lawyer and politician
- Harry H. Laughlin (1880–1943), American eugenicist
- Homer Laughlin (1843–1913), American businessman and potter
- James Laughlin (1914–1997), American poet
- James Laughlin (industrialist) (1806–1882), American banker and financier
- James Laurence Laughlin (1850–1933), American economist
- John Laughlin (disambiguation)
- Nicholas Laughlin (born 1975), Trinidadian editor and writer
- Robert B. Laughlin (born 1950), American physicist
- Simon Laughlin, British neurobiologist, on the Committee of the Rank Prize for Optoelectronics
- Tom Laughlin (1931–2013), American actor
- Tom Laughlin (born 1971), American professional wrestler better known as Tommy Dreamer
- William S. Laughlin (1919–2001), American anthropologist
- Zoe Laughlin, British artist, maker and materials engineer

== Given name ==
- Laughlin Phillips (1924–2010), American museum director

== See also ==
- McLaughlin (surname)
- Laughlin Peak
