= Kuzych v White =

Series of Canadian labour law cases

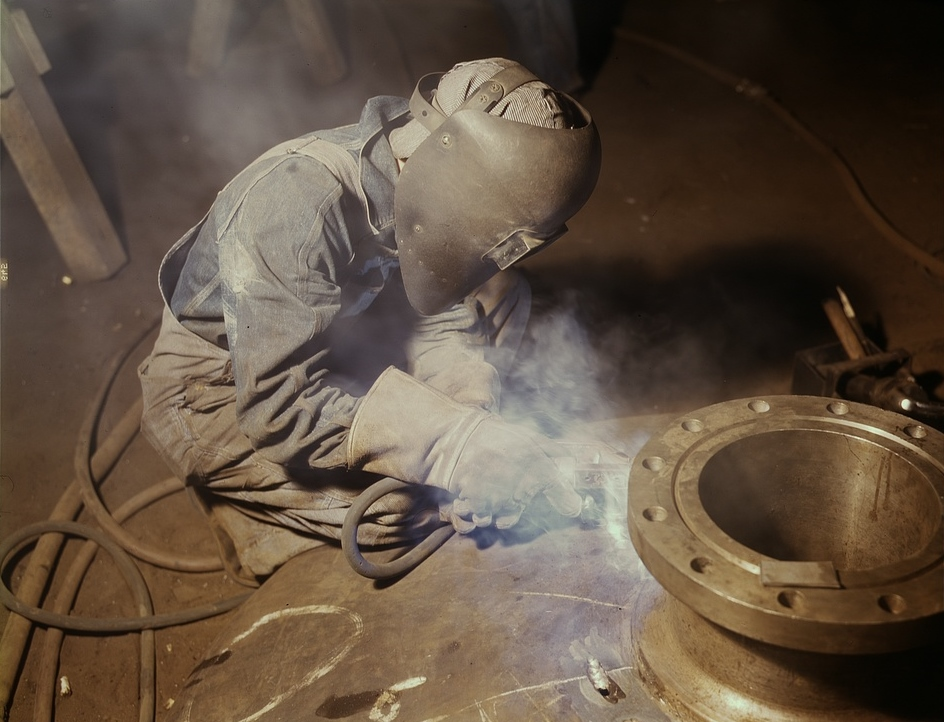
- A welder working on shipbuilding
- Court: Judicial Committee of the Privy Council
- Full case name: William Lloyd White and others v Myron Kuzych
- Decided: June 20, 1951
- Citations: [1951] AC 585, [1951] UKPC 18, [1951] 3 DLR 641, 1951 CanLII 373

Case history
- Appealed from: British Columbia Court of Appeal
- Subsequent actions: Petition for re-hearing by Judicial Committee, December 17, 1951

Court membership
- Judges sitting: Viscount Simon; Lord Porter; Lord Morton of Henryton; Lord Reid; Lord Asquith of Bishopstone

Case opinions
- Union member who is expelled from union must exhaust appeals under the union constitution before applying to the courts for relief
- Decision by: Viscount Simon

Keywords
- Union membership; internal appeals

Kuzych v White was a series of Canadian labour law decisions from British Columbia, dealing with a membership dispute between a trade union and a member of the union. Myron Kuzych, the union member, publicly objected to the closed shop favoured by the Boilermakers and Iron Shipbuilders Union of Canada (BISU). The union cancelled his membership, resulting in him being fired by the shipyard where he worked as a welder. Kuzych challenged the termination in the British Columbia courts, and eventually the matter was decided by the Judicial Committee of the Privy Council in Britain, at that time the highest court of appeal in the British Commonwealth. The Judicial Committee ruled that Kuzych should have exhausted his appeals within the union before going to court, and upheld his expulsion from the union.

Since the leadership of the BISU was dominated by members of the Communist Party of Canada, the dispute was portrayed at the time as an individual worker opposed to radical unionism. More recent scholarship has shown that Kuzych was actually a more radical socialist than the union leadership. He disapproved of closed shops because in his view they weakened unions, by interfering with the democratic rights of union members. He also believed that the closed shop co-opted the union leadership into assisting the employer to maintain workplace productivity, at the expense of the interests of the union members themselves.

The dispute was driven by ideological differences within the union movement, and occupied the courts of British Columbia for close to a decade. The decision of the Judicial Committee was simply one stop along the long litigation road – and not the final stop, at that. Before the matter was concluded, six judges of the British Columbia Supreme Court, five judges of the British Columbia Court of Appeal, and five law lords in Britain had given decisions in the various aspects of the dispute, from 1944 to 1953. There were also two attempts to appeal related matters to the Supreme Court of Canada.

The case continues to be cited by Canadian courts for the requirement that union members must exhaust internal union settlement procedures before resorting to the courts. The same principle has been applied more generally, to other private organizations with internal appeal processes.

== Background ==
=== Boilermakers and Iron Shipbuilders Union ===
During the Second World War, new techniques evolved to speed up shipbuilding production. Welding largely replaced riveting in the construction of ships. In British Columbia, the Boilermakers and Iron Shipbuilders Union of Canada (BISU) became the primary union representing welders in the shipbuilding industry. (Note: The BISU broke away from the International Brotherhood of Boilermakers, Iron Ship Builders, Blacksmiths, Forgers and Helpers in 1927.) In 1942, its leadership came to be dominated by members of the Communist Party of Canada. At the time of events, Bill White and William Stewart were two of the leaders of the union. The union leadership strongly favoured the closed shop, where workers had to join the union in order to obtain work in the shipyards. They took the view that a closed shop was necessary to obtain union security, which in turn was the only guarantee that the employer would bargain with the union and respect a collective agreement.

=== Myron Kuzych ===
Myron Kuzych was born Miroslav Kuzych in 1911, in a small village near Kolomyia, Ukraine, then part of the Russian Empire. After the First World War, that area of Ukraine became part of Poland. In 1926, Kuzych and his twin brother emigrated to Canada, to avoid being drafted into the Polish Army. As a young man in Canada, he acquired a good education in the Vancouver public schools.

At the time of the events, Kuzych was characterized by his opponents as a "scab", "anti-union", and a "class traitor". It was alleged that he was in the pay of the employers. More recent scholarship has clarified Kuzych's ideological views on unionism. During the Great Depression, he became interested in socialism and was influenced by the thinking of Daniel De Leon, an American Marxist theoretician and trade union organizer. Briefly a member of the Communist Party of Canada, he later was a member of the Socialist Labor Party, which was strongly Marxist. Kuzych was a fervent believer in unionism, but rejected the labour relations system of the American Wagner Act, which heavily influenced labour relations laws. He was committed to democratic, grassroots control of unions. He believed that the closed shop, where the union leadership reached an agreement with the management, undercut democratic organization of unions by giving too much control to the union leadership. In his view, the union leaders became committed to ensuring labour peace and productivity to benefit the employer, not the union membership.

In 1942, Kuzych obtained a position as a welder in the North Vancouver Ship Repairs shipyard, which had a collective agreement with the BISU. He made a voluntary donation to the union and attended union meetings, but he objected to the requirement that he become a member. However, early in 1943, the union insisted that all workers at the shipyard be union members. The management confirmed to Kuzych that if he was not a member, he would be dismissed. Kuzych signed the union card to keep his job. The union card stated that one of the conditions of membership was to support the goals and constitution of the union, which included the closed shop. Members were also not to publicly criticize the union.

=== Conflict between Kuzych and the BISU ===
Kuzych and the union leadership under White and Stewart quickly came into conflict. In 1943 the provincial government set up a conciliation board to consider workplace issues at West Coast Shipbuilders, the last remaining open shop shipyard in Vancouver. Kuzych appeared before the board and strongly criticized the concept of a closed shop, and the leadership of the union. His position was that the Communist-led BISU was not radical enough in fighting the employers for the rights of union members. The local media highlighted Kuzych's submissions, and flagged that a union member was criticizing the union leadership and their closed shop policy. Not knowing about Kuzych's personal views on socialism and unions, the media portrayed the dispute as an anti-union worker challenging the Communist-led union.

The conciliation board recommended that the shipyard remain an open shop. White concluded that Kuzych was either a paid operative of business groups, or an anti-union individual acting on his own. White believed that whatever Kuzych's reasons, his testimony before the commission had "served the bosses."

In addition to his appearance before the conciliation board, Kuzych spoke out against the closed shop policy at union meetings, and in letters to local newspapers. Kuzych organized challenges to the union leadership in the next set of elections, including calling a public meeting to organize the election campaign. White and Stewart considered the meeting to be a breach of the term of the union constitution that members would not publicly challenge union policies. Kuzych initially stood for election as union president, but withdrew to avoid vote-splitting. Kuzych's favoured candidate, C. A. Henderson, was elected, defeating Stewart, but the internal opposition from the Communist Party members of the union was strong, and eventually Henderson was replaced by White.

Kuzych also made some appearances on radio, discussing his opposition to the closed shop and automatic dues-checkoffs, which he saw as benefitting the union leadership, not the workers:

A better set-up for procuring a comfortable living, without doing any work, can hardly be invented! Once the workingmen are properly yoked into the closed shop and union dues and all the many extra assessments are checked off by the company time-keepers every month, regularly as death and taxes, the labor-dictator's worries are over! For them, at any rate, the millenium has been reached!

The BISU responded by taking disciplinary proceedings against Kuzych under the union constitution, for publicly criticising both the union leadership and the closed shop requirement. In December 1943, the union cancelled his membership and expelled him from the union, resulting in his firing by the North Vancouver shipyard. Kuzych successfully challenged the expulsion in the British Columbia Supreme Court (the trial court) on procedural grounds. In 1944, the court awarded him $1,000 as damages for lost wages and re-instated him as a member of the union. The BISU then restarted the disciplinary proceedings and in 1945 again cancelled his membership, again resulting in his firing by North Vancouver shipyard. Kuzych again challenged the decision in the courts.

== Decisions of the British Columbia courts ==
=== Supreme Court ===
Kuzych brought another action in the British Columbia Supreme Court. He sought a declaration that he had not been validly expelled and was still a member in good standing; damages; and consequential relief. He challenged the fairness of the disciplinary hearing, including whether the committee had been properly constituted under the union's by-laws: an ineligible member had been elected, which Kuzych argued meant that the union had acted in breach of his membership contract. White, as president and representative of the BISU, defended the union's conduct, including advancing the novel argument that since a closed shop was in restraint of trade, there was no valid contract of membership between Kuzych and the union, so there had not been any breach of contract.

After initial skirmishes in the British Columbia Supreme Court and the British Columbia Court of Appeal, including an attempt by the union to appeal to the Supreme Court of Canada, the matter came on for trial before Justice Norman William Whittaker of the Supreme Court. In 1949, he ruled in favour of Kuzych. He rejected the union's argument that there had been no valid contract and found that the BISU had not strictly followed its own internal disciplinary process, resulting in an unfair process: it was so flawed and biased that it was a nullity. Whittaker also commented on the serious consequences for Kuzych if his membership was cancelled: since he would not be able to work in closed shops, expulsion was "little less than a sentence of industrial death". The BISU was therefore in breach of the membership contract. The court awarded $5,000 in punitive damages and directed that Kuzych be re-instated.

=== Court of Appeal ===
On behalf of the union, White appealed to the British Columbia Court of Appeal. The appeal was heard by five judges of the Court of Appeal: the Chief Justice of British Columbia, Gordon M. Sloan, and Justices O'Halloran, Robertson, Sidney Smith and Bird. In 1950, by a 3–2 decision, the Court of Appeal upheld the trial decision and the orders for punitive damages and re-instatement.

The three judges in the majority each gave their own reasons for the decision, but they approached the matter in a similar fashion. All three judges were of the view that individuals have the right to work at their trade. Justices O'Halloran and Robertson agreed with the trial judge's conclusion that the BISU discipline committee was biased against Kuzych from the start, believing him to be anti-union, and were determined to expel him. They also agreed that one member of the committee had stated that anyone who supported Kuzych would "get the works", which was interpreted as a threat to ensure Kuzych would be expelled. In their view, the proceedings of the committee were so flawed as not to amount to a true hearing at all. They also rejected the argument, advanced for the first time on appeal, that Kuzych should have first used the internal union appeal mechanism, which provided for an appeal to the executive of the Shipyard General Workers' Federation. They concluded that since the discipline proceeding was so flawed, it was a nullity. There was therefore nothing for Kuzych to appeal under the union constitution, and he could go directly to the courts.

Justice Sydney Smith took a somewhat different approach. He held that the committee was properly constituted, but he agreed that the union leadership was biased and had prevented a fair hearing by the committee and then by the union membership. He also held there was no need for Kuzych to appeal internally, as the courts continued to have jurisdiction when men's livelihood was at stake.

Justice Bird wrote in dissent, the Chief Justice concurring. They did not agree that the committee was improperly constituted. It was correct that an ineligible member had originally been elected to the standing discipline committee, but the union had dealt with that issue by having all members of the committee resign and holding a new election. Bird agreed that this process did not comply strictly with the by-laws, but concluded that it was "a reasonable and practical compliance with the spirit of the by-laws", a bona fide attempt to resolve the problem caused by the election of an ineligible member.

With respect to the internal union appeal process, Justice Bird concluded that Kuzych was bound by the contractual obligation to exhaust his internal appeals before going to the courts. The allegations of an unfair process were a factor that could be raised in that appeal. Nor was there anything to suggest that the appeal body would act in bad faith. Kuzych therefore should have followed the internal union appeal process, and until he did so and got a decision, the courts did not have jurisdiction. Bird would have dismissed the appeal, but without prejudice to Kuzych's right to return to the courts, if dissatisfied by the result of the internal appeal.

== Decision of the Judicial Committee ==
=== Reasons for judgment ===
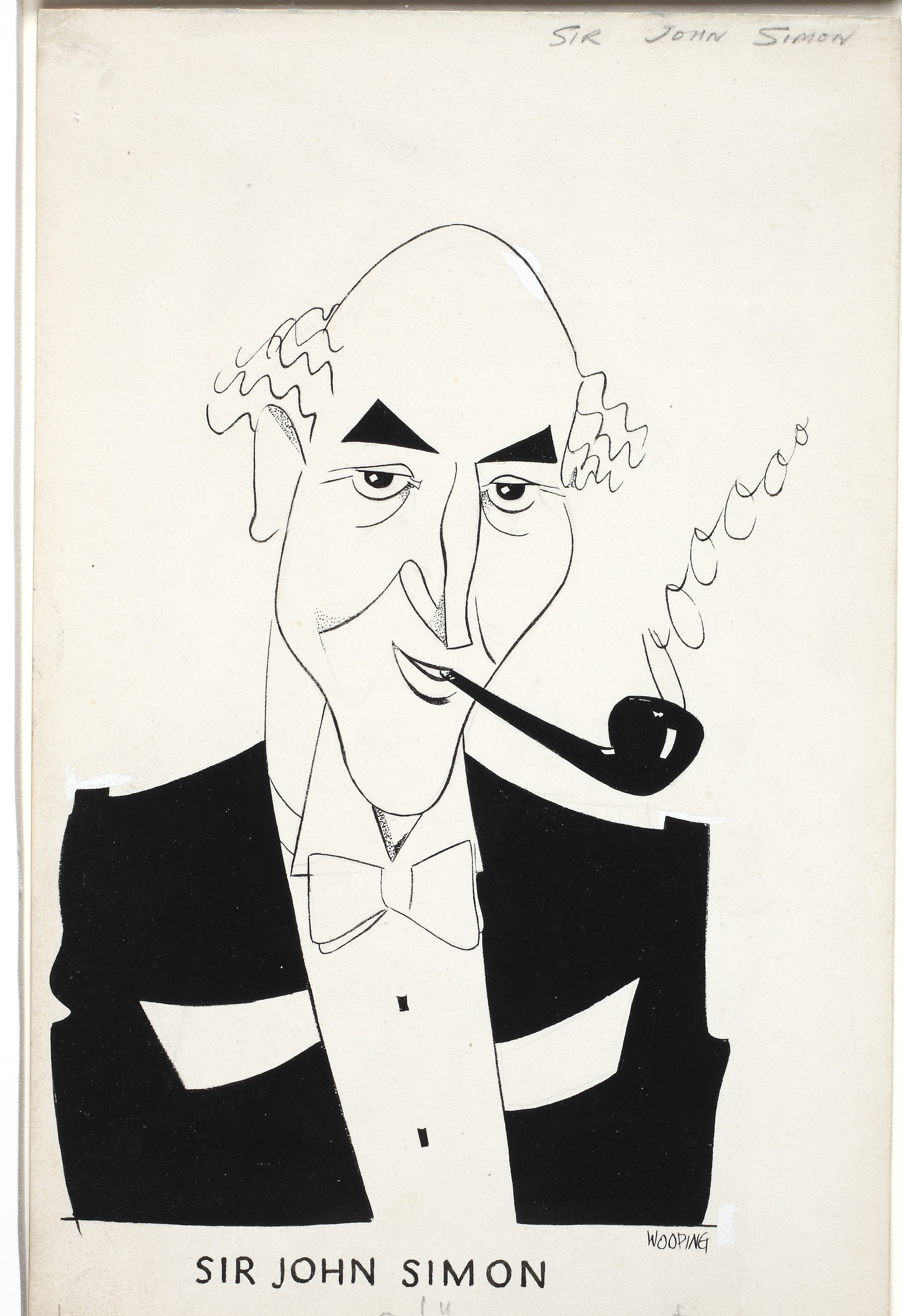
Viscount Simon, who gave the decision of the Judicial Committee

On behalf of the union, White appealed to the Judicial Committee of the Privy Council in Britain. At that time, the Judicial Committee was the highest court of appeal for the British Commonwealth, including Canada. Appeals could go directly to the Judicial Committee from the provincial appellate courts, without being appealed to the Supreme Court of Canada. White's lawyers were Senator J. W. de B. Farris and Nathan Nemetz. Kuzych was represented by A. W. Johnson.

The Judicial Committee was composed of five law lords, senior judges who were members of the British House of Lords. They ruled in favour of the Communist-led union. Viscount Simon, a former Lord Chancellor, gave the decision on behalf of the Judicial Committee. In his view, the case came down to two issues: was the discipline committee properly constituted? And if so, did Kuzych need to rely on the internal appeal mechanism before applying to the courts? The basic ideological issues which had triggered the litigation, such as a closed shop and union democracy, were not part of the case before the Judicial Committee.

On the first issue, Viscount Simon concluded that the discipline proceedings had been properly constituted. He acknowledged that there had been some irregularities in the appointment of the members of the union committee, but he agreed with Justice Bird's position that the union's solution of new elections was a "reasonable and practical solution", consistent with the "spirit of the by-laws".

Viscount Simon held on the second issue that "after anxious reflection", the law lords had concluded that Kuzych was required to rely on the union's internal appeal mechanism before he could apply to the courts. Simon acknowledged that there were serious issues of bias in the proceedings in the disciplinary proceedings. The question was whether the conduct of the proceedings was so flawed as not to constitute a decision at all. He concluded that was not the case. There clearly had been a decision by the committee, confirmed by the union membership, following the process set out in the union by-laws. Whether it was the correct decision, or a tainted decision, was a matter for an appeal.

He rejected the argument that the appeal system would be biased against Kuzych and therefore he should not be required to lodge an appeal. Viscount Simon held that there was no reason to believe that the executive of the Shipyard General Workers' Federation would not treat the matter fairly and attempt to give the right final decision. In any event, Kuzych was bound by the membership contract to pursue an appeal to that body, before he could go to the courts.

=== Petition for re-hearing ===
The Judicial Committee therefore allowed the appeal, with judgment on June 20, 1951. In December 1951, Kuzych petitioned the Judicial Committee for a rehearing of the case. On December 17, 1951, the Judicial Committee dismissed the petition, apparently without written reasons.

== Contempt proceedings ==
While the expulsion was under appeal, there was an ancillary proceeding in the British Columbia courts, raising an allegation of contempt of court by White and Stewart.

=== White and Stewart found in contempt ===
Kuzych had first brought his action on May 14, 1945, against White and other members of the union as representatives of the BISU. The union was not itself a party to the action. While the action was pending, on November 19, 1945, the BISU merged with two other unions to form a new union, the Marine Workers' and Boilermakers' Industrial Union. White became the president of the new union and Stewart the secretary-treasurer.

On September 22, 1949, Justice Whittaker of the Supreme Court gave his decision ordering that Kuzych be re-instated as a member of the BISU. On October 11, 1949, Kuzych made a formal demand on White to issue him a membership card in the new union. At a business meeting of the union, the executive was instructed to deny Kuzych a membership card.

Kuzych then brought an application to the Supreme Court, accusing White and Stewart of contempt of court for failing to comply with Justice Whittaker's order. On December 14, 1949, Justice Whittaker found White and Stewart in contempt and ordered them committed to jail.

=== Appeal to the British Columbia Court of Appeal ===
White and Stewart then appealed to the British Columbia Court of Appeal. By a 2–1 decision, the court allowed their appeal and set aside the contempt order. The majority, composed of Chief Justice Sloan and Justice Bird, held that the re-instatement order had only applied with respect to the BISU. The new union was a completely new entity and was not subject to the order. Since the old union had ceased to exist, there was no power to re-instate Kuzych. White and Stewart were therefore not in contempt. In dissent, Justice Sydney Smith held that the merger of the unions did not extinguish Kuzych's right of re-instatement, and therefore the order continued to apply. He would have upheld the contempt order.

=== Attempted appeal to the Supreme Court of Canada ===
Kuzych then applied to the British Columbia Court of Appeal for leave to appeal the contempt ruling to the Supreme Court of Canada. The application was heard by Chief Justice Sloan and Justices Sidney Smith and Bird, the same judges who had decided the appeal on the contempt matter. In an oral decision on June 6, 1950, they unanimously granted Kuzych leave to appeal, on condition that he pay White and Stewart the costs of their successful appeal of the contempt order to the Court of Appeal. The costs amounted to $1,200.

On June 19, 1950, Kuzych returned to the Court of Appeal and moved to modify the court's order granting leave. He planned to seek permission from the Supreme Court to appeal in forma pauperis, which would relieve him of the obligation to post a $500 bond with the Supreme Court. He asked that the Court of Appeal also waive the costs requirement. The court split 2–1 on that request, the same split as on the contempt decision itself. Chief Justice Sloan and Justice Bird held that there was no basis for them to change their order, while Justice Sidney Smith in dissent would have done so.

There is no record of Kuzych appealing the contempt matter to the Supreme Court.

== Subsequent proceedings ==
=== Attempt at internal appeal ===
After the decision of the Judicial Committee, Kuzych filed an appeal of the expulsion decision with the Shipyard General Workers' Federation. A newspaper account indicated that the Federation dismissed the appeal because it was filed late, several years past the 60 days from the original BISU expulsion decision. A second ground was that the BISU had merged with two other unions and had surrendered its charter with the Shipyard General Workers' Federation. Since the BISU was no longer a member, the Federation stated it had no jurisdiction to consider the appeal.

=== Court application for membership ===
In 1952, Kuzych started an action for a declaration and an injunction, naming White, Stewart and others as representatives of the Marine Workers' and Boilermakers' Industrial Union, as well as the Shipyard General Workers' Federation. He claimed that the merger of the BISU with the other unions had been contrary to the BISU constitution. Alternatively, he claimed a declaration that he was a member in good standing of the Marine Workers' Union and the Federation. White and the other defendants moved to strike the claim, unsuccessfully. Justice Clyne of the Supreme Court ruled that the objections did not apply at the preliminary stage, but could be raised as potential defences if the matter went to trial.

White, Stewart and the other defendants then brought an application for a stay of the new action, on the basis that Kuzych had not paid the outstanding costs which the Judicial Committee had ordered in their decision on the action challenging his expulsion. That application was heard by Justice Manson, who dismissed it on procedural grounds, without prejudice to return for a hearing on the merits. When the matter came on for a hearing on the merits of the costs argument, Justice Coady held that the objection was valid. Since the outstanding costs order related to a similar court action, Kuzych could not proceed with the new action until he paid the costs. Justice Coady entered a stay of the action.

Kuzych then appealed to the British Columbia Court of Appeal. In a short decision, Chief Justice Sloan gave the unanimous decision of himself and Justices Robertson and Bird. They held that Justice Coady had correctly applied the law in staying the action until Kuzych paid the outstanding costs.

== Ongoing relevance ==
The Judicial Committee decision in White v Kuzych continues to be cited in Canadian cases and law texts. After a period when the Canadian courts were more interventionist in trade union internal matters, they have returned to the principle set out in Kuzych, that the courts need to respect the internal appeal processes of unions. The Judicial Committee decision has also been cited as applying generally in relation to internal appeals in other contractual associations. It has also been cited in texts relating to aspects of contract law such as injunctions and specific performance, as well as damages.

The case has been cited by the Supreme Court of Canada, most recently in 1979. The most recent citation in a lower court decision was by the Ontario Superior Court in 2018.

== Summary of the litigation ==
| Decision No. | Year | Citation | Issue | Judge(s) | Outcome |
|---|---|---|---|---|---|
| 1 | November 4, 1944 | Kuzych v. Stewart et al., BCSC | Action by Kuzych to challenge first expulson from union | Farris CJSC | Union conceded wrongful expulsion; membership restored; $1,000 damages for lost wages |
| 2 | January 20, 1947 | Kuzych v. White (No. 1), BCSC | Action by Kuzych to challenge second expulsion from union | Macfarlane J. | Expulsion upheld; consistent with union constitution |
| 3 | 1948 | Kuzych v White, BCCA (unreported) | Appeal by Kuzych from trial decision on second expulsion | Sloan CJBC, O'Halloran and Sidney Smith JJ.A. | Counsel for union raises possibility of illegal contract for first time; in unreported oral reasons, Court of Appeal sends it back to the British Columbia Supreme Court for re-trial |
| 4 | June 3, 1948 | Kuzych v. White et al. (No. 2), BCCA | Application by White for leave to appeal to Supreme Court of Canada | Sloan CJBC, O'Halloran and Sidney Smith JJ.A. | Union dissatisfied with Court of Appeal's order directing new trial; applies for leave; application dismissed |
| 5 | September 22, 1949 | Kuzych v. White et al. (No. 2), BCSC | Second trial of second expulsion from union | Whittaker J | Expulsion held to be unjustified; re-instatement ordered, and punitive damages of $5,000 |
| 6 | December 14, 1949 | Kuzych v White (No. 4) BCSC | Kuzych brings contempt application | Whittaker J | White and Stewart held in contempt; ordered committed to jail |
| 7 | May 3, 1950 | Kuzych v White et al. (No. 4), BCCA | Appeal by White of second trial of second expulsion | Sloan CJBC; O'Halloran, Robertson, Sidney Smith, and Bird JJA | 3-2 decision; majority dismisses White's appeal and upholds trial decision of Whittaker J; dissent would have required Kuzych to exhaust internal appeals under union constitution |
| 8 | May 3, 1950 | Kuzych v White et al. (No. 4), BCCA | Appeal by White and Stewart of contempt finding | Sloan CJBC, Sidney Smith and Bird JJA | Appeal allowed on 2–1 split; contempt order set aside; BISU had ceased to exist so not possible to re-instate Kuzych |
| 9 | June 6, 1950 | Kuzych v White (No. 5), BCCA (unreported) | Application by Kuzych for leave to appeal contempt decision to the Supreme Court of Canada | Sloan CJBC, Sidney Smith and Bird JJA | Unanimous oral decision to grant leave, on condition of paying costs from contempt appeal |
| 10 | June 22, 1950 | Kuzych v. White (No. 5), BCCA | Application by Kuzych to amend leave application to waive costs order | Sloan CJBC, Sidney Smith and Bird JJA | 2-1 decision; application to waive costs order dismissed |
| 11 | 1950 | Kuzych v White SCC | Notice of appeal filed by Kuzych | — | No steps taken on appeal |
| 12 | June 20, 1951 | White v Kuzych, JCPC | White appeals ruling on second expulsion to Judicial Committee | Viscount Simon, Lord Porter, Lord Morton of Henryton, Lord Reid, Lord Asquith of Bishopstone | Appeal allowed; expulsion decision consistent with union constitution; Kuzych required to exhaust internal appeals under union constitution |
| 13 | December 19, 1951 | White v Kuzych, JCPC (unreported) | Kuzych petitions Judicial Committee for re-hearing | — | Petition dismissed |
| 14 | July 11, 1952 | Kuzych v. White et al. (No. 6), BCSC | Motion by White to strike third action brought by Kuzych | Clyne J | Motion dismissed; objections can be raised in defence to action, but not at preliminary pleadings stage |
| 15 | 1953? | Kuzych v. White (No. 7), BCSC (unreported) | Motion by White to stay third action brought by Kuzych | Manson J | Dismissed on procedural grounds, without prejudice to reapply |
| 16 | September 9, 1953 | Kuzych v. White (No. 7) BCSC | Motion by White to stay third action brought by Kuzych | Coady J | Costs order outstanding from previous related action; stay entered until costs paid |
| 17 | December 15, 1953 | Kuzych v. White et al. (No. 7), BCCA | Appeal by Kuzych from stay of proceedings | Sloan CJBC, Robertson and Bird JJA | Appeal dismissed |
