= Nelson Peery =

American writer

Nelson Peery (June 22, 1923 – September 6, 2015) was an American political activist and author. Peery spent over 60 years in the revolutionary movement, and was active in the Communist Party USA (CPUSA), the Provisional Organizing Committee to Reconstitute the Marxist–Leninist Party (POC), the Communist League (CL), the Communist Labor Party (CLP), and the League of Revolutionaries for a New America (LRNA).

He grew up in rural Minnesota, the son of a postal service worker in the only black family in the town. His older brother was the physicist and astronomer Benjamin Peery. He hoboed across the western United States and joined the U.S. Army in World War II. These experiences, which became the subject of his memoir Black Fire: The Making of an American Revolutionary, shaped his ideas about racism and the American economy.

In his sequel Black Radical: The Education of an American Revolutionary, Peery wrote about his re-entry into civilian life following the war. The book offers a perspective on the historically significant period from 1946–68, including the postwar, grassroots movement for equality and democracy led by black veterans, the battles of the black Left and revolutionaries during the McCarthy era and their role in the Freedom Movement, and the 1965 Watts Riots in Los Angeles, where Peery and his family were living at the time. Peery compares these political goals to those of the United States in World War II. He died on September 6, 2015, at the age of 92.

== Works ==
- Black Radical: The Education of an American Revolutionary, 1946-1968, ISBN 978-1595581457 (2007)
- The Future Is Up To Us: A Revolutionary Talking Politics with the American People (2002)
- Moving Onward: From Racial Division to Class Unity with Brooke Heagerty, ISBN 978-0967668703 (2000)
- Black Fire: The Making of an American Revolutionary (1994)
- Entering an Epoch of Social Revolution (1993)
- African American Liberation and Revolution in the United States (1992)
- The Negro National-Colonial Question (1975)
