= Nightfall (Asimov novelette and novel) =

1941 short story by Isaac Asimov

- Nightfall 1990 edition
- Author: Isaac Asimov; Robert Silverberg
- Language: English
- Genre: Science fiction
- Publication date: 1990
- Publication place: United States
- Media type: Print (hardback & paperback)
- Pages: 352
- ISBN: 978-0-553-29099-8
- OCLC: 24434629

"Nightfall" is a 1941 science fiction short story by the American writer Isaac Asimov about the coming of darkness to the people of a planet ordinarily illuminated by sunlight at all times. It was adapted into a novel with Robert Silverberg in 1990. The short story has appeared in many anthologies and six collections of Asimov stories. In 1968, the Science Fiction Writers of America voted "Nightfall" the best science fiction short story written prior to the 1965 establishment of the Nebula Awards and included it in The Science Fiction Hall of Fame, Volume One, 1929–1964.

== Background ==
Written from March 17 to April 9, 1941 and sold on April 24, the short story was published in the September 1941 issue of Astounding Science Fiction under editor John W. Campbell. It was the 32nd story by Asimov, written while he was a graduate student in chemistry at Columbia University. Campbell asked Asimov to write the story after discussing with him a quotation from Ralph Waldo Emerson:

If the stars should appear one night in a thousand years, how would men believe and adore, and preserve for many generations the remembrance of the city of God!

Campbell's opinion was to the contrary: "I think men would go mad". He and Asimov chose the title together.

Campbell bought the story at a bonus rate of 1 1/4 cents per word – the normal rate being one cent – and at more than 13,000 words, "Nightfall" was Asimov's longest story yet. Consequently, Asimov received US$166 (equivalent to $3,600 in 2025), more than twice any previous payment for a story. He later said that before "Nightfall" neither he nor anyone else other than perhaps Campbell considered him more than a "third rater"; his name appeared on the cover of Astounding for the first time, and the story made him one of the field's top writers. Asimov believed that the unusual plot of "Nightfall" distinguished it from others, but "The Last Question" was his own favorite story.

In 1988, Martin H. Greenberg suggested Asimov find someone who would take his 47-year-old short story and—keeping the story essentially as written—add a detailed beginning and a detailed ending to it. This resulted in the 1990 publication of the novel Nightfall by Isaac Asimov and Robert Silverberg. As Asimov relates in the Robert Silverberg chapter of his autobiography, "Eventually, I received the extended Nightfall manuscript from Bob [Silverberg] ... Bob did a wonderful job and I could almost believe I had written the whole thing myself. He remained absolutely faithful to the original story[,] and I had very little to argue with."

== Plot summary ==
The planet Lagash ("Kalgash" in the novel) is constantly illuminated by the six suns of its multiple-star system. Areas of darkness exist in enclosed areas on Lagash, such as caves, tunnels, and windowless rooms, but night never falls, because at least one sun is present in the sky at any given time.

A skeptical journalist visits a university observatory to interview a group of scientists who warn that civilization on Lagash will soon end. The researchers explain that they have discovered evidence of numerous ancient civilizations on the planet, all destroyed by fire, with the collapses occurring about 2,000 years apart. Furthermore, the religious writings of a doomsday cult claim that Lagash periodically passes through an enormous cave where mysterious "stars" appear. The stars are said to rain down fire from the heavens and rob people of their souls, reducing them to beast-like savages.

The scientists use this apparent myth, along with recent discoveries in gravitational research, to develop a theory about the repeated collapse of society. A mathematical analysis of Lagash's orbit around its primary sun reveals irregularities caused by the presence of a previously undiscovered moon that cannot be seen in the light of day. Calculations indicate that this "invisible" moon will soon obscure one of Lagash's suns when it is alone in the sky, resulting in a total eclipse that recurs every 2,049 years. Having evolved on a planet with no diurnal cycle, all Lagashians possess an intense, instinctive fear of the dark. Psychological experiments involving darkness have revealed that Lagashians may suffer permanent mental illness or even death after as little as 15 minutes of exposure and the eclipse is projected to last for over half a day. This, coupled with the diameter of the umbra being at least as great as that of the planet, ensures that the entire world population will experience an unprecedented period of prolonged, widespread darkness.

The scientists theorize that earlier civilizations on Lagash were destroyed by people who went insane during previous eclipses and, desperate for any light source, started large fires that destroyed cities. Oral accounts of the resulting chaos from crazed survivors and their children were passed down through the ages and formed the basis for the doomsday cult's sacred texts. Present-day civilization is doomed for the same reasons, but the researchers hope that saving a few hundred sane people in a hideout lit by newly invented torches and conducting detailed observations of the upcoming eclipse will help to break the cycle of societal collapse.

The scientists are unprepared for the stars. Because of the perpetual daylight on Lagash, its inhabitants are unaware of the existence of stars apart from their own; Lagashian astronomers estimate that the entire universe is no more than a few light-years in diameter and may hypothetically contain a small number of other suns. However, Lagash is located in the center of a giant cluster and, during the eclipse, the night sky, the first that any living person on Lagash has ever seen, is filled with the dazzling light of more than 30,000 newly visible stars.

Learning that the universe is far vaster and Lagash far more insignificant than they believed, coupled with the worldwide darkness produced by the eclipse, drives everyone, including the scientists, insane. Outside the observatory, in the direction of the city, the horizon begins glowing with the light of spreading fires as "the long night" returns to Lagash.

== Setting and novel ==
The system of Lagash has six stars named Alpha, Beta, etc., in the original short story, whereas each has a proper name in the novel.

In the novel, Onos is the primary sun of Lagash and is located 10 light-minutes away, similar to the distance from Earth to the Sun. The other five suns are minor in comparison, but provide enough light to prevent the inhabitants of Lagash from defining "night". The only other distance given is that Tano and Sitha form a binary star system about 11 times as far away as Onos.

- Onos – yellow dwarf, similar to the Sun
- Dovim – red dwarf
- Trey and Patru – class A or F main sequence stars, described as "white", a binary star system (Romanian words for three and four)
- Tano and Sitha – class A, B, or O main sequence stars, described as "blue", a binary star system

From what can be drawn from the text, Onos, the star appearing brightest and largest in Lagash's sky, is the star that Lagash orbits. Onos, in turn, orbits around the binary system Trey and Patru, the other binary system Tano and Sitha, and the red dwarf star Dovim. In addition to these stars, the only other celestial object mentioned is Lagash's moon, dubbed Lagash Two by the scientists of Lagash. Lagash Two follows an eccentric orbit around Lagash and every 2049 years it eclipses Dovim, during a period when from one part of Lagash, Dovim is the only star that would be visible.

The characters of the novel travel to three separate locations on Lagash. Most of the book is set in Saro City, which is situated near a large forest with trees, bushes, and graben (scavenger animals). As stated in the book's introduction, the weather in the book is often appropriate to the mood swings of the characters in the book, and the region of Saro City receives rains that last several days. The first major weather fluctuation mentioned in the book is the sandstorm that Siferra 89 avoided by hiding under a tarpaulin with her crew. The other weather event was the monsoon-like rains that occurred after Sheerin 501 returned from a consultation in Jonglor, which is described as a northern city. Siferra 89 travels to Beklimot, which is described as half a world away from Jonglor. Beklimot is located on the Sagikan Peninsula, near mountains. Beklimot is in a sandy, arid desert region.

== Adaptations in other media ==
In the 1950s, the story was adapted for the radio programs Dimension X and X Minus One.

In 1976, Analog Records, as their only release, presented a further dramatization of "Nightfall" on a 33 1/3 rpm vinyl record, produced by James Cutting and recorded at American Learning Center. After the story, it includes a dialog between Isaac Asimov and Ben Bova.

Dawn is a 1981 novel written by Dean McLaughlin as a re-imagining of Nightfall.

In 1988, Nightfall, a low-budget movie, was produced based upon the story. The movie was shot on location at the Arcosanti Project, using the resident community members as background actors. Another film version, Nightfall, was made in 2000.

In 1989, George Alec Effinger wrote a parody of the original short story, titled "Maureen Birnbaum After Dark." This story was included in the collections Foundation's Friends and Maureen Birnbaum, Barbarian Swordsperson.

In April 2007, the story was the 100th episode of Escape Pod, a science-fiction podcast.

Liu Cixin's Three-Body trilogy (2006–2010) recounts an invasion of the Earth by an alien civilization from planet Trisolaris, which orbits a triple star. Unlike Lagash, Trisolaris frequently experiences unpredictable and cataclysmic changes in sunlight.

== See also ==
- Solar eclipses in fiction
