= Hawk Among the Sparrows =

"Hawk Among the Sparrows" is a science fiction short story by Dean McLaughlin. It was first published in Analog Science Fiction in July 1968.

== Synopsis ==
Howard Farman is a fighter pilot from 1975, who finds himself — and his plane, the Pika-Don — in the midst of the First World War, where his future knowledge and technology are of less advantage than he expected.

== Reception ==
"Hawk Among the Sparrows" was a finalist for the 1969 Hugo Award for Best Novella, and the Nebula Award for Best Novella of 1968.

In Galactic Journey, Gideon Marcus praised it as "very pleasant (and) quite readable", and commended McLaughlin for incorporating the logistics of jet fuel production into the story, but faulted the notion that Farman (a man from 1975) could have thousands of hours of flight time but no experience of prop planes; as well, Marcus found that Farman is "oblivious for far too long of the effects of jet wash", and particularly doubted that the Pika-Don would still be usable "after several months in a field with no maintenance".

== Origins ==
James Nicoll has posited that McLaughlin may have been inspired by a 1948 John W. Campbell essay about "the limits of reverse engineering".
