= Lockey =

Lockey is a surname. Notable people with the surname include:

- Charles Lockey (1820-1901), English singer
- Justin Lockey (born 1980), British musician
- Rowland Lockey (1565-1616), English painter and goldsmith
- Thomas Lockey (c. 1602–1679), English librarian and Anglican priest
- Tilly Lockey (born 2005), British amputee

== See also ==
- Lockie, a surname and given name
- Lokey, a surname
- Loki (disambiguation)
