= 59 Serpentis =

Multiple star systemin the constellation Serpens

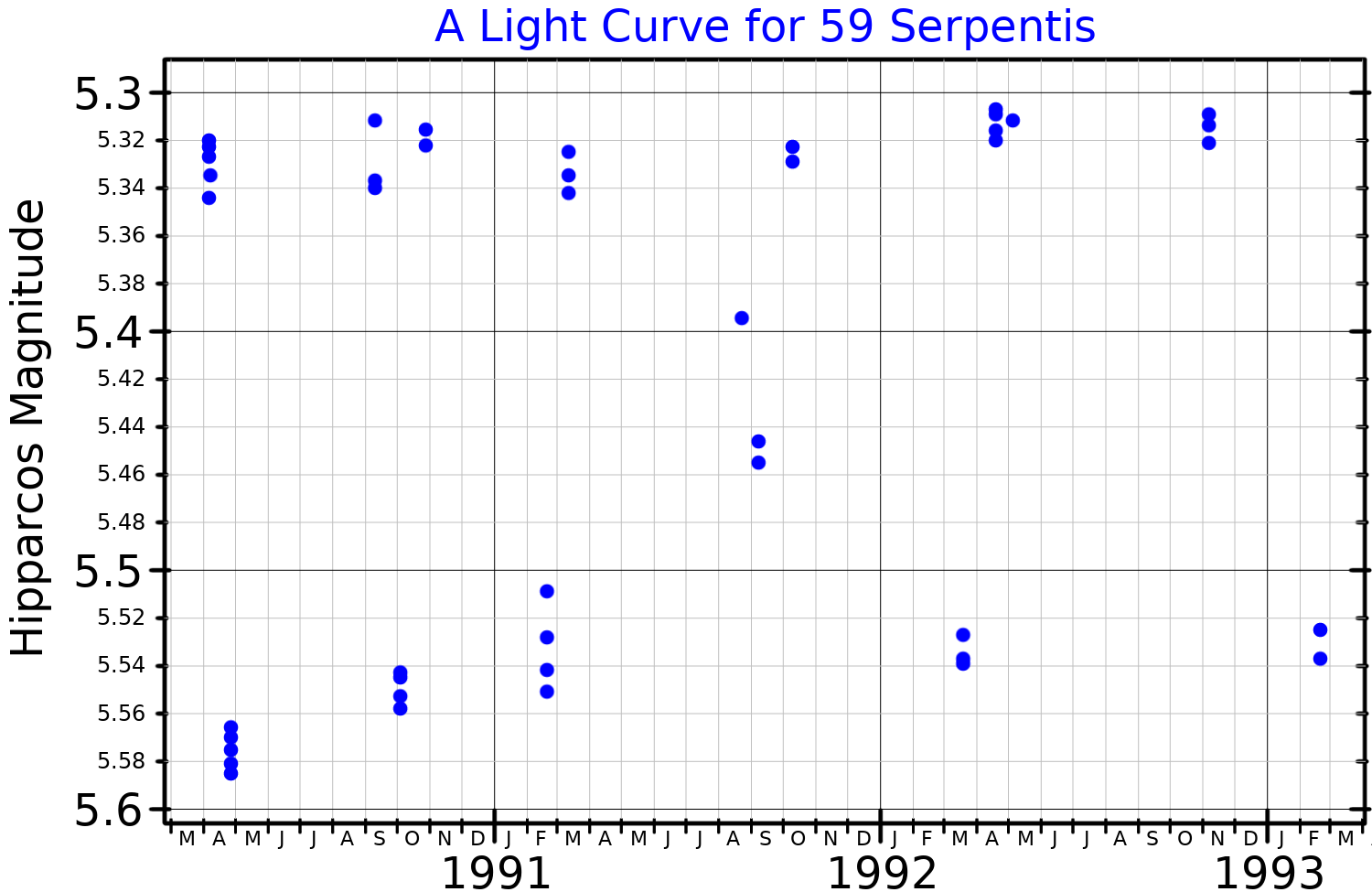
- A light curve for 59 Serpentis, plotted from Hipparcos data

Observation data Epoch J2000.0 Equinox ICRS
- Constellation: Serpens
- Right ascension: 18^{h} 27^{m} 12.50775^{s}
- Declination: +00° 11′ 45.9912″
- Apparent magnitude (V): 5.17 – 5.29

Characteristics
- Spectral type: A0Vs + G:III
- U−B color index: +0.21
- B−V color index: +0.48
- Variable type: Irregular?

Astrometry
Radial velocity (R_{v})	−23.3 km/s
Proper motion (μ)	RA: −3.67 mas/yr Dec.: −8.61 mas/yr
Parallax (π)	6.95±0.63 mas
Distance	470 ± 40 ly (140 ± 10 pc)
Absolute magnitude (M_{V})	−0.57

Details

Aa
Mass	6.32 M_{☉}
Radius	13 R_{☉}
Temperature	5,093 K
Age	316 Myr

Ab1
Mass	4.13 M_{☉}
Radius	2.2 R_{☉}
Temperature	9,700 K

Ab2
Mass	3.39 M_{☉}
Radius	1.8 R_{☉}
Temperature	9,700 K

Ba
Mass	3.17 M_{☉}
Radius	1.7 R_{☉}
Luminosity	10.1 L_{☉}
Surface gravity (log g)	4.28 cgs
Temperature	7,981 K

Other designations
- 59 Ser, d Ser, HIP 90441, HR 6918, BD+00°3936, ADS 11353, CCDM J18272+0012
- A: HD 169985
- B: HD 169985

Database references
SIMBAD	data
- A
- B

59 Serpentis, also known as d Serpentis, is a multiple star in the constellation Serpens. The system shows irregular variations in brightness between magnitudes 5.17 and 5.29.

== Components ==
59 Serpentis appears as a close pair of stars, of 5th magnitude and 7th magnitude respectively, separated by four arc-seconds. The brighter of the two is itself an even closer binary with the two stars separated by only 0.2″, and only 0.1″ when they were first detected. The stars are designated Aa, Ab, and B.

The primary star, component Aa, is a G0 giant. Component Ab is spectroscopic binary with a period of 1.85 days; the two stars are very similar A-class main sequence stars. Component B is an F5V possible astrometric binary, but with little known about the orbit or the possible companion.

A much fainter star 20″ away is also thought to be a member of the system, having a common proper motion and similar parallax, and is designated as component C.

The first detailed orbital solution for this triple system was published in 1943 by Elizabeth Cornwall Tilley. Her work established that 59 Serpentis A consists of a G-type giant star (component Aa) and a close pair of two A-type main-sequence stars (forming component Ab).

Tilley's 1943 paper also provided the first estimates for the radii of the stars in the triple system: approximately 13 R☉ for the G-type giant, and 2.2 R☉ and 1.8 R☉ for the two A-type stars.
