= Lachlan (name) =

- Pronunciation: /ˈlæxlən, ˈlæklən, ˈlɒklən/ LAK(H)-lən, LOK-lən
- Gender: Masculine
- Language: English

Origin
- Language: Scottish Gaelic
- Origin: Lachlann

Other names
- Variant form: Lachann
- Pet names: Lachie, Locky, Loki, Lachy, Lochles, and Lockie
- Related names: Lachina, Laughlin, Lochlain, Lochlainn, and Loughlin

Lachlan (/ˈlæxlən, ˈlæklən, ˈlɒklən/) is a masculine given name of Scottish Gaelic origin.

== Origins ==
The name is an Anglicised form of the Scottish Gaelic Lachlann, which is in turn derived from the earlier Gaelic personal name Lochlann.

In the ninth century, the terms Laithlinn / Laithlind (etc.), appear in historical sources as terms denoting the origin of Vikings active in Ireland. The exact meaning behind these terms is uncertain. What is clear, however, is that the terms Lochlann / Lochlainn (etc.) came to replace these earlier terms; and that, by the eleventh century, Lochlann / Lochlainn certainly referred to Norway in historical sources. Whether the terms Lochlann / Lochlainn were originally related to Laithlinn / Laithlind, or merely conflated with them, is unknown. In mediaeval Irish literature, the term Lochlann refers to a vague faraway place: sometimes the Otherworld, and sometimes Scandinavia.

Pet forms of Lachlan include Lachie, Lachy, Lach, and Lockie (/ˈlɒki/ LOK-ee). A feminine form of the name is Lachina. A related form of Lachlan is the Irish Lochlainn. Anglicised forms of this latter name include Laughlin (/ˈlɒklɪn, ˈlɒxlɪn, ˈlɒflɪn/ LOK(H)-lin, LOF-lin) and Loughlin (/ˈlɒklɪn/ LOK-lin). Lochlainn has also been rendered into English as Lawrence. A variant form of Lachlann in Argyll is Lachann, a name influenced by the similarly sounding (though etymologically unrelated) Eachann. (Note: These names were frequently borne by the MacLeans. A passage from the earliest Scottish Gaelic novel (1912)—Dùn Àluinn no an t-Oighre 'na Dhìobarach—remarks that pedigrees of the family sounded like a dog lapping soup or porridge: "Mar choinn ag òl eanaraich, tha ainmean Chloinn 'Illeathainn: Eachann, Lachann; Eachann, Lachann; Eachann, Lachann; Teàrlach".) Historically, the name Lachlan and its variants were most commonly found in Argyll. The following proverb contains the name Lachlan : "Mar mhadadh ag ol eanruich ainmean Chlann ‘ll ‘Eathain “Eachann, Lachann.” or; "Like a hound lapping broth are the names of the Clan Maclean "Eachan, Lachan" "Hector, Lachlan".

The senior branch of Clan Maclean are the Macleans of Duart. This branch was established in the 14th century on the Inner Hebridean Isle of Mull. The first Laird was known as Lachainn Lubanach or "Lachlan the crafty". Of the first fourteen Lairds of Duart, seven were named Lachlan and seven were named Hector. Forms of the name Lochlainn were borne by Uí Néill and other families in the Early Middle Ages. Before the beginning of the nineteenth century, forms of the name were common amongst families in northern Ireland, but have since become unfashionable. Forms of the name Lachlan were historically common amongst families with connections to the Scottish Highlands, but have become popular in Australia and New Zealand. A less common variant is the name Lauchlan.

Modern patronymic forms of the personal name Lochlann include the Irish surnames Mac Lochlainn, and Ó Lochlainn. A patronymic form of the personal name Lachlann is the Scottish Gaelic surname MacLachlainn. Forms of the personal names first appear on record in the tenth century. The earliest known bearer of such names was Lochlaind mac Maíl Shechnaill, heir of the Corca Mruad, whose death is noted by the Annals of Inisfallen in 983. Another member of the Corca Mruad, a certain Lochlainn, is recorded by the same source to have been slain in 1015. Afterwards, the principal family of the region was the Uí Lochlainn, who bore the surname Ua Lochlainn. In Ulster, the Annals of Ulster record the slaying of a Lochlainn mac Maíl Shechlainn, an Uí Néill dynast, in 1023. This man's powerful grandson, Domnall Ua Lochlainn, High King of Ireland, ensured that their descendants, the Meic Lochlainn, bore the surnames Mac Lochlainn and Ua Lochlainn. The eponymous ancestor of the Scottish Clann Lachlainn, traditionally regarded as yet another branch of the Uí Néill, was a much later man who bore a form of the name Lachlan.

== Popularity ==
In the 2000s and 2010s, Lachlan was a common baby name in Australia and New Zealand, ranking within the top ten masculine names registered in several Australian states. In 2008, Lachlan was ranked as the third most popular masculine baby name in New South Wales, with 581 registered that year. The same year, the name was ranked as the sixth most popular masculine baby name in Victoria, with 438 registered. In 2013 it was the tenth most popular name for boys in Australia. In 2018, the name was more popular in New Zealand than in Australia, as it ranked 13th in New Zealand, and 17th in Australia. The name used to be popular in Scotland, and Ireland, but the use of the name in those countries has been decreasing in recent years.

== People ==
=== Given name ===
==== Lachlann ====
- Lachlann Mac Ruaidhrí (fl. 1297–1307/1308), Scottish magnate

==== Lachlan ====
- Lachlan, Lord of Galloway (died 1200)
- Lachlan Boshier (born 1994), New Zealand rugby union player
- Lachlan Buchanan (born 1990), Australian actor
- Lachlan Burr (born 1992), Australian rugby league player
- Lachlan Coote (born 1990), Australian rugby league player
- Lachlan Dent (born 2000), Australian basketball player
- Lachlan Donald Ian Mackinnon (1882–1948), Royal Navy officer
- Lachlan Dreher, Australian field hockey player
- Lachlan “Lac” Edwards, Australian gridiron football player
- Lachlan Elmer, Australian field hockey player
- Lachlan Gillespie (born 1985), Australian children's entertainer
- Lachlan Gordon-Duff (1817–1892), British politician, MP for Banffshire
- Lachlan Grant (1871–1945), Scottish doctor
- Lachlan Hansen, Australian rules footballer
- Lachlan Mackinnon (born 1956), Scottish poet, critic and literary journalist
- Lachlan Maclean (disambiguation), several people
- Lachlan Macleay (born 1931), American officer in the United States Air Force, trained as an astronaut
- Lachlan Macquarie (1762–1824), Scottish officer in the British Army, last autocratic Governor of New South Wales
- Lachlan Maranta (born 1992), Australian Rugby League player
- Lachlan McCaffrey (born 1990), Australian rugby union player
- Lachlan McGillivray (c. 1718 – 1799), Scottish emigrant to Georgia, fur trader and plantation owner
- Lachlan McIntosh (1725–1806), Scottish American general in the Continental Army
- Lachlan McLean (news anchor) (born 1968), American radio host
- Lachlan McPherson (born 1900), Scottish footballer with Notts County, Swansea and Everton
- Lachlan Mitchell, Australian rugby union player
- Lachlan Morton (born 1992), Australian professional road racing cyclist
- Lachlan Murdoch (born 1971), Australian and British media executive
- Lachlan Nieboer (born 1981), English actor and producer
- Lachlan Olbrich (born 2003), Australian basketball player
- Lachlan Pendragon (fl. 2020's), Oscar-nominated Australian animator
- Lachlan Power (born 1995), Australian YouTuber
- Lachlan Renshaw, Australian middle-distance runner
- Lachlan Ross (born 1973), Australian rules footballer
- Lachlan Stevens (born 1978), Australian cricket player and coach
- Lachlan Turner (born 1987), Australian rugby union player
- Lachlan Wales (born 1997), Australian soccer player
- Lachlan Walmsley (born 1998), Scottish rugby league footballer
- Lachlan Watson, American actor

==== Lachie/Lachy ====
- Lachy Doley, Australian musician
- Lachie Henderson, Australian rules footballer
- Lachy Hulme (born 1971), Australian actor and screenwriter
- Lachie Hunter (born 1994), AFL footballer
- Lachie McMillan (1900–1983), Scottish footballer
- Lachie Munro (born 1986), New Zealand rugby player
- Lachie Neale (born 1993), AFL footballer
- Lachie Plowman (born 1994), AFL footballer
- Lachie Stewart (1943–2025), Scottish distance runner
- Lachie Thomson (1873–1940), English footballer
- Lachie Whitfield (born 1994), AFL footballer

==== Lochlann/Lochlan/Lochlainn ====
- Lochlainn Ó hUiginn (died 1464), member of the Ó hUiginn brehon family
- Lochlann Ó Mearáin (born 1973), Irish actor
- Lochlann of Galloway (died 1200), Lord of eastern Galloway
- Lochlann Óg Ó Dálaigh, 17th-century Irish poet
- Lochlainn O'Raifeartaigh (1933–2000), Irish physicist
- Lochlann Quinn (born 1941), Irish entrepreneur
- Lochlan Watt (born 1987), Australian broadcaster
- S. Lochlann Jain, writer and academic

== Fictional characters ==
- Lachlan Cairns, a character in the SCP Foundation mythos
- Lachlan Fraser, from the Australian soap opera Home and Away
- Lachlan "Lockie" Leonard, main character in Tim Winton's Lockie Leonard books
