= Laura H. McLaughlin =

Computer, instructor, and researcher of astronomy

- Born: Laura Elizabeth Hill; September 3, 1893; Philadelphia, Pennsylvania
- Died: February 22, 1991 (aged 97)
- Education: Northwestern University; University of Michigan
- Spouse: Dean Benjamin McLaughlin (m. 1927)
- Children: 5
- Scientific career
- Fields: Astronomy
- Workplaces: University of Michigan
- Thesis: A Micro-Photometric Study of the Spectrum of Beta Lyrae

Laura Elizabeth Hill McLaughlin (September 3, 1893 - February 22, 1991) was an American astronomer. As an astronomer of the Detroit Observatory for the University of Michigan, she conducted research work alongside her husband, fellow Detroit Observatory astronomer Dean B. Mclaughlin.

== Early life and education ==
Raised within the Methodist Home for Children in Philadelphia, Pennsylvania, Laura Elizabeth Hill was the first of the Home ever to attend college. She received a B.A. in Astronomy in 1917 with her thesis, “Proper Motions of Stars from Micrometric Measures” from Northwestern University in Evanston, Illinois. She then remained at Northwestern to achieve an M.A. in Astronomy.

To earn a doctoral degree, she went to the University of Michigan. By 1929, she had graduated with a Ph.D. in Astronomy with her dissertation, “A Micro-Photometric Study of the Spectrum of Beta Lyrae”. The dissertation was conducted under the direction of Detroit Observatory Director Ralph Hamilton Curtiss. This was the last of her major research publications.

== Career ==
Alongside her education, McLaughlin also worked in teaching and computer positions. Specifically, while pursuing her bachelor’s degree, she taught physics, mathematics, and German at three high schools in South Dakota and New Jersey. When pursuing a Master’s degree, she worked at the Dearborn Observatory as a computer. Her name and computational works appear in the publication “Stellar Parallaxes: Determined from Photographs made with the 18½-inch Refractor of the Detroit Observatory”. Prior to beginning Ph.D. work at the University of Michigan, she taught at Vassar College in Poughkeepsie, New York.

== Personal life and legacy ==
Mclaughlin married fellow Detroit Observatory astronomer Dean Benjamin McLaughlin in 1927. It was that year that Dean joined the U-M Faculty as an assistant professor of astronomy, coming from Swarthmore College where he spent three years as an instructor of mathematics and astronomy. While Mclaughlin assisted her husband in his astronomical research efforts at the Detroit Observatory, she did not publish any independent work after the creation of her dissertation. They had five children: one son (science-fiction writer Dean McLaughlin Jr.) and four daughters (Elizabeth Schick, Laura Alberta Dawson, Sarah McLaughlin, and Margaret Farley), and fourteen grandchildren. She remained an active participant in Methodist Church community activities until her death in 1991.
