= Loughlin =

The surname Loughlin has several origins. In some cases it a form of the surname McLaughlin (derived from the Irish Mac Lochlainn). In other cases, Loughlin is a form of O'Loughlin (derived from the Irish Ó Lachtnáin).

== People with the surname ==
- Anne Loughlin (1894–1979), British labour activist
- Charles Loughlin (1914–1993), British politician
- Clem Loughlin (1892–1977), Canadian professional ice hockey player
- Elliott Loughlin (1910–1989), United States Navy Rear Admiral
- Gerard Loughlin, English theologian
- Irene Loughlin (born 1967), Canadian performance artist
- Jessica Loughlin (born 1975), Australian artist
- Jimmy Loughlin (born 1905), English footballer
- John Loughlin (disambiguation), several people
- Larry Loughlin (1941–1999), American baseball pitcher
- Lori Loughlin (born 1964), American actress and producer
- Luke Loughlin, Irish Gaelic footballer
- Martin F. Loughlin (1923–2007), United States District Judge
- Matt Loughlin, American sports broadcaster
- Paul Loughlin (born 1966), English rugby league player
- Wilf Loughlin (1896–1966), Canadian ice hockey player

== People with the given name ==
- Loughlin O'Brien

== Other things with the name ==
- Bishop Loughlin Memorial High School
