= Dean McLaughlin (writer) =

American science fiction writer (born 1931)

Dean Benjamin McLaughlin Jr. (born 1931) is an American science fiction writer. He was the son of astronomers Dean B. McLaughlin and Laura Elizabeth Hill Mclaughlin.

His best-known work is Hawk Among the Sparrows (1968), which was nominated for both the Hugo Award and Nebula Award for Best Novella. It concerns a late-20th century fighter plane which travels through time, and tries to contend with World War I aircraft. Other works include Dawn (1980), a novel inspired by Isaac Asimov's "Nightfall". His novella, Tenbrook of Mars, appeared in the July/August 2008 issue of Analog.
