= Lockie =

Lockie is a surname and a given name. The surname is a variant of the surname Lucas. The given name is a nickname of the given name Lachlan.

== People with the surname ==
- Bryn Lockie (born 1968), Scottish cricketer
- Jeff Lockie, American football player
- John Locke, English surveyor, author of Lockie's Topography of London
- Ken Lockie (born 1956), English musician
- Tom Lockie (1906–1977), Scottish footballer and manager

== People with the given name ==
- Lockie Crowther (1940–1993), Australian sailboat designer
- Lockie Ferguson (born 1991), New Zealand cricketer
- Lockie Wood (1904–1990), Australian rules footballer

== Fictional characters ==
- Lockie Leonard, a fictional character in a series of children's novels
- Lockie Campbell, a character in UK soap opera Hollyoaks

== See also ==
- Lockie Leonard (TV series)
- Lockey, a surname
- Lokey, a surname
- Loki (disambiguation)
