= Niall Mac Lochlainn =

King of Cenél nEógain and Cenél Conaill

Niall Mac Lochlainn (died 1176) was a Cenél nEógain king of the Northern Uí Néill. He was a member of the Meic Lochlainn, and a son of Muirchertach Mac Lochlainn, King of Cenél nEógain. Ruaidrí Ua Conchobair, King of Connacht divided Tír nEógain between Niall and Áed Méith Ua Néill in 1167. Muirchertach's granddaughter, Findguala, who married Guðrøðr Óláfsson, King of Dublin and the Isles, appears to have been a daughter of Niall.

== Citations ==
=== References ===
- Flanagan, MT (1989). Irish Society, Anglo-Norman Settlers, Angevin Kingship: Interactions in Ireland in the Late Twelfth Century. Oxford: Clarendon Press. ISBN 0-19-822154-1.
- Lydon, J (2005) [1998]. The Making of Ireland: From Ancient Times to Present. New York: Routledge. ISBN 0-415-01347-X.
- Martin, FX (2008) [1987]. "John, Lord of Ireland, 1185–1216". In Cosgrove, A (ed.). Medieval Ireland, 1169–1534. New History of Ireland. Oxford: Oxford University Press. pp. 127–154. ISBN 978-0-19-821755-8.
- McDonald, RA (2007). "Dealing Death From Man: Manx Sea Power in and around the Irish Sea, 1079–1265". In Duffy, S (ed.). The World of the Galloglass: Kings, Warlords and Warriors in Ireland and Scotland, 1200–1600. Dublin: Four Courts Press. pp. 45–76. ISBN 978-1-85182-946-0.
- McDonald, RA (2007). Manx Kingship in its Irish Sea Setting, 1187–1229: King Rǫgnvaldr and the Crovan Dynasty. Dublin: Four Courts Press. ISBN 978-1-84682-047-2.
- McGettigan, D (2005). "Mac Lochlainn". In Duffy, S (ed.). Medieval Ireland: An Encyclopedia. New York: Routledge. pp. 294–295. ISBN 0-415-94052-4.
- Pollock, M (2005). "Rebels of the West, 1209–1216". Cambrian Medieval Celtic Studies. 50: 1–30. ISSN 1353-0089.
