= James B. Kaler =

American astronomer and science writer (1938–2022)

James Bailey "Jim" Kaler
- Born: December 29, 1938; Albany, New York, U.S.
- Died: November 26, 2022 (aged 83)
- Education: University of Michigan, Christian-Albrechts-Universität zu Kiel, UCLA
- Alma mater: University of Michigan, UCLA
- Occupations: Astronomer, science writer
- Years active: 1961–2003
- Employer: University of Illinois

James Bailey "Jim" Kaler (December 29, 1938 – November 26, 2022) was an American astronomer and science writer.

== Personal life and education ==
Kaler was born to Earl and Hazel Holmgren Kaler on December 29th, 1938. After elementary and high-school education in Albany, New York, Kaler earned his A.B. at the University of Michigan in 1960. He attended graduate school at the University of Michigan (1960–61), at Christian-Albrechts-Universität zu Kiel (Germany, 1961–62), and UCLA (1962–64), where he also obtained his Ph.D. in Astronomy 1964. His thesis advisor was Lawrence H. Aller. He was married to Maxine Grossman and they had four children. Kaler died due to complications of Parkinson's Disease on November 26, 2022, at the age of 83.

== Professional career ==
Kaler started his professional career with appointments as a research and teaching assistant at the University of Michigan from 1958 to summer 1960. In 1961 he worked as an astronomer with the United States Naval Observatory. In 1964 he was appointed as an assistant professor of Astronomy by the University of Illinois, and promoted to associate professor in 1968 and to a full professor position in 1976 (all at University of Illinois). Since 1995 he is Campus Honors Faculty. In 2003 he retired to become professor emeritus at the University of Illinois.

Kaler published over 120 papers. Examples include work on

- the chemical composition of planetary nebulae including their electron densities, on
- emission lines of planetary and diffuse nebulae, on
- the development of shells in planetary nebulae, and on
- stellar evolution.

He has served as president of the board of directors of the Astronomical Society of the Pacific and of the Board of the Champaign Urbana Symphony Orchestra.

== Honors and awards ==
- He has held Fulbright and Guggenheim Fellowships, and has been awarded medals for his work from the University of Liège in Belgium and the University of Mexico.
- He gave the Armand Spitz Lecture to the Great Lakes Planetarium Association and the Margaret Noble Address to the Middle Atlantic Planetarium Society.
- In 2003 he received the 2003 Campus Award for Excellence in Public Engagement by the University of Illinois.
- In 2008 he received the American Astronomical Society's Education Prize.
- He was elected a Legacy Fellow of the American Astronomical Society in 2020.
- Asteroid 17851 Kaler, discovered by the Near-Earth Asteroid Tracking program in 1998, was named after him, honoring his outreach activities.

== Works ==
Jim Kaler has written for a variety of magazines, and was a consultant for Time-Life Books. He has long appeared on Illinois television and radio. In addition to two textbooks and three audio courses, he published several books, including

- First Magnitude: A Book of the Bright Sky
- Stars and their Spectra,
- The Ever-Changing Sky,
- Extreme Stars (American Association of Publishers Outstanding Professional and Scholarly Title in Physics and Astronomy for 2001),
- The Cambridge Encyclopedia of Stars,
- Stars and Cosmic Clouds,
- The Little Book of Stars,
- The Hundred Greatest Stars, and
- Heaven's Touch (selected Book of the Week by Times Higher Education in September 2009).

His online star database "STARS" has scored more than 4 million visitors since its release in 1988.
