= Benjamin F. Peery =

American astrophysicist, astronomer and professor

Benjamin Franklin Peery, Jr.
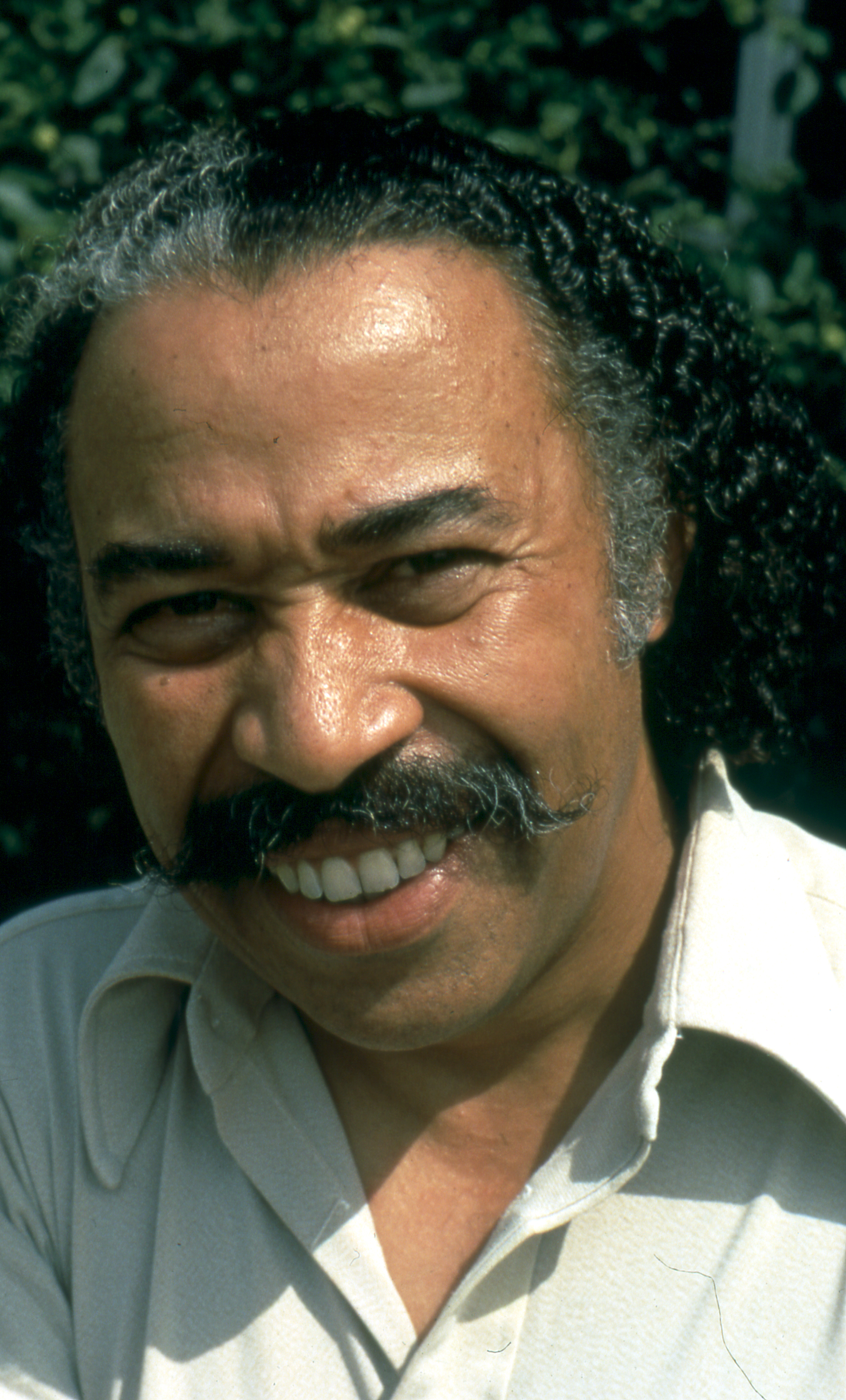
- Born: March 4, 1922; St. Joseph, Missouri
- Died: November 30, 2010 (aged 88)
- Education: University of Minnesota; Fisk University; University of Michigan
- Scientific career
- Workplaces: Indiana University; Howard University
- Thesis: [ProQuest 302109121 The system VV cephei] (1962)
- Doctoral advisor: Dean Benjamin McLaughlin

Benjamin Franklin Peery Jr., (4 March 1922 - 30 November 2010) was an American physicist, astronomer, and longtime professor at Indiana University and Howard University. He was the second African American person to receive a doctorate in astronomy.

== Early life and military service ==
Benjamin F. Peery was born on 4 March 1922 in St. Joseph, Missouri, to Benjamin Peery Sr., and Caroline Watkins Peery, and was the oldest of seven brothers. His father was a railway mail clerk and wrote for the Twin Cities Herald, and his mother was a school teacher. His younger brother, Nelson Peery, was a political activist and author. The Peery family moved frequently for Benjamin Peery, Sr.'s line of work, eventually settling in southeast Minnesota. The Peerys lived in Randolph, Minnesota; Wabasha, Minnesota; and eventually Minneapolis, Minnesota, where Peery attended and graduated high school. Prior to attending college, he worked as a draftsman.

After one year of college, in 1942 Peery joined the Army Air Force, in which he served from 1942 until 1945, participating in campaigns in Italy and North Africa.

== Education ==
Peery attended the University of Minnesota as an undergraduate for one year before joining the military. After completing his service, he returned to the university on the G.I. Bill to complete his studies. After receiving his bachelor's degree in physics in 1949, he worked as a physics instructor for two years at North Carolina A&T State University.

Peery then attended Fisk University in Nashville, Tennessee, where he received a master's degree in physics in 1955. His master's thesis involved the study of infra-red spectrum and structure of PO C13. He then continued his graduate studies at the University of Michigan, completing a doctorate in astronomy in 1962. His thesis was titled "The system VV cephei," and his doctoral advisor was Dean Benjamin McLaughlin. His thesis work was supported in part by a University Fellowship that Peery was awarded between 1958 and 1959.

Some of his fellow students at Michigan included Edward Spiegel, Martha Hazen, Arthur Upgren and Lowell Doherty. He also studied under Leo Goldberg, Freeman Miller, and Lawrence H. Aller.

== Career ==
In 1959, while still completing his doctorate, Peery began teaching at Indiana University, and accepted a position there as assistant professor of astronomy in 1962. In 1968 he was appointed associate professor with permanent tenure and in 1973 was promoted to full professor. While at Indiana, Peery was active in research and helped to add a 16-inch telescope to the Morgan-Monroe State Forest Station of the Goethe Link Observatories near Martinsville, Indiana. He also worked with the National Science Teachers Association's (ASTA) Elementary School Science Program. In 1975–1976, he took a sabbatical leave to conduct research at Kitt Peak National Observatory in Tucson, Arizona.

In 1977, he left Indiana for a position at Howard University, where he had been recruited to start an astrophysics graduate program. There, he became chair of the physics and astrophysics departments. At this point, it was estimated that Peery was one of only five Black astronomers in the United States. He remained at Howard University until 1992, when he retired and became an emeritus professor. While at Howard, he also took two years' leave at the National Science Foundation to serve as its program director for the astronomy division.

In 1991, Peery was featured in episode five of the PBS documentary "The Astronomers." Over the course of his career, he was also a member of several professional organizations, including: the International Astronomical Union; the Astronomical Society of the Pacific; the American Astronomical Society; the American Association for the Advancement of Science; and as a trustee of the Adler Planetarium in Chicago, Illinois. He also conducted research at Cerro Tololo Inter-American Observatory in Chile, and was a visiting professor at Harvard University, the California Institute of Technology and the College of William and Mary.

== Research ==
While at Indiana, Peery designed and constructed one of the first oscilloscope measuring engines, which was referred to colloquially as "the Peeryscope." His early research centered on cool giant stars and, but later progressed to the chemical makeup of stars, including systems in which the radioactive element technetium could be identified in the spectrum. His research has also included the physics of stellar structure, evolution and nucleosynthesis, and the physics of interacting binary stars.

== Legacy ==
Peery is the namesake of the Benjamin F. Peery Jr. Diversity Award, a graduate scholarship at Indiana University.

== Personal life ==
Peery was married to Darnelle Macklin Peery, a special education teacher, whom he met while a student at Fisk University. They had one daughter, Yvany Peery, who is a psychotherapist.
