= David O'Loughlin =

David O'Loughlin may refer to:

- David O'Loughlin (cyclist) (born 1978), Irish cyclist
- David O'Loughlin (politician) (fl. 2000s–2020s), Australian politician
- David O'Loughlin (rugby union) (1916—1971), Irish international rugby union player
