= Elizabeth Cornwall Tilley =

American astronomer

Elizabeth Roberts Cornwall Tilley (née Elizabeth Roberts Cornwall; 1914–1996) was an American astronomer known for her spectrographic study of the multiple star system 59 Serpentis. She earned her Ph.D. in astronomy from the University of Michigan in 1943. Her doctoral thesis, "A Spectrographic Study of the Triple System in 59 d Serpentis," was supervised by astronomer Dean Benjamin McLaughlin and became a foundational work in understanding this complex stellar system and continues to be cited in astronomical research.

== Education and personal life ==
Elizabeth Roberts Cornwall was born in New Haven, Connecticut, in 1914 to Mr. and Mrs. Charles E. Cornwall. She attended Vassar College, graduating in 1935, where she was elected to the academic honor society Phi Beta Kappa. She then pursued graduate studies, earning a Master of Arts degree from Wellesley College in 1939.

In March 1942, while she was a graduate student in the Astronomy Department at the University of Michigan, her engagement to Thomas Clark Tilley was announced. Thomas Tilley, a graduate of Yale University, was studying at the University of Michigan Law School at the time.

== Doctoral research on 59 d Serpentis ==
Tilley's doctoral research focused on 59 d Serpentis, a star that appears single to the naked eye but is a quadruple star system. The system's primary component is itself a spectroscopic triple system, a rare configuration that made it a subject of significant interest.

This primary component consists of a cooler, large G-type giant star and a close binary pair of hot, white A-type main-sequence stars. Tilley's investigation was the first to determine the detailed orbital elements for this triple system. Her research built upon the 1938 independent discovery by her advisor, Dean B. McLaughlin, and French astronomer R. Tremblot, who first identified three distinct spectra, confirming the system's triple nature.

To conduct her analysis, Tilley utilized spectrograms taken at several major observatories between 1938 and 1942, including the University of Michigan Observatory, Mount Wilson Observatory, and Yerkes Observatory. Her 1943 paper, published in The Astrophysical Journal, detailed her findings:

- The G-type giant and the A-type binary pair orbit their common center of mass every 386 days.
- The two A-type "white twins" orbit each other every 1.85 days.
- The paper provided detailed calculations for the orbits, masses, radii, and inclinations of the stars in the system, concluding that eclipses were unlikely.

Tilley's findings were presented at a meeting of the American Astronomical Society in Cambridge, Massachusetts, in May 1943 and were reported on in The New York Times. The report highlighted that 59 d Serpentis was one of only a few known cases where three spectra were visible from a star system and the only one at the time for which the system's details had been fully determined.

== Later career and legacy ==
Elizabeth Cornwall Tilley received her Ph.D. from the University of Michigan in 1943. Her 1943 publication, "A Spectrographic Study of the Triple System in 59 d Serpentis," remains a key reference for the 59 Serpentis system.

According to a 1954 National Register of Scientific and Technical Personnel compiled by the American Institute of Physics, Tilley reported her professional status as "retired" by November 1954.
