= O'Loughlin =

The surname O'Loughlin is an Anglicised form of the Irish Ó Lochlainn meaning "descendant of Lochlann". According to historian C. Thomas Cairney, the O'Loughlins were a chiefly family of the Corco Modhruadh tribe who in turn came from the Erainn tribe who were the second wave of Celts to settle in Ireland from about 500 to 100 BC.

== People with the surname ==
- Alex O'Loughlin (born 1976), Australia-born actor
- Charlie O'Loughlin (born 1989), English football defender
- Chris O'Loughlin (fencer) (born 1967), American Olympic fencer
- David O'Loughlin (disambiguation)
- Gerald S. O'Loughlin (1921–2015), American actor
- Harold J. O'Loughlin (1900–1968), American lawyer, businessman, and politician
- Keiron O'Loughlin, (born 1953), English professional rugby league footballer
- Jack O'Loughlin (Australian footballer) (1873–1960)
- Laurence O'Loughlin (1854–1927), South Australian politician
- Marina O'Loughlin, British journalist, writer and restaurant critic
- Michael O'Loughlin (born 1977), Australian rules footballer
- Sean O'Loughlin (born 1982), English professional rugby league footballer
- Silk O'Loughlin (1872–1918), American baseball umpire
- Thomas O'Loughlin, Professor of Historical Theology
- Vanessa O'Loughlin, British-born writer and literary agent

=== Families ===
- O'Loughlin Farrell family, includes the above Keiron and Sean

== See also ==
- Irish clans
