= Lokey =

Lokey is a surname. Notable people with the surname include:

- Derek Lokey (born 1985), American football defensive tackle
- Hicks Lokey (1904–1990), American animator
- Lorry I. Lokey (1927-2022), American businessperson and philanthropist

== See also ==
- Houlihan Lokey, international investment bank
- Lokey Peak, small, sharp peak or nunatak, in the Gutenko Mountains of central Palmer Land, Antarctica
- Norok Lokey, 1969 Khmer film starring Chea Yuthon and Sak Si Sboung
- Lo-Key?, former American funk/R&B band that formed in Kansas City, Missouri and Minneapolis, Minnesota, United States
- Lo-Key Fu, contemporary producer, performer and remixer based in Perth, Western Australia
- Lo Key, American creator of music and visual arts
- Lockey, a surname
- Lockie, a surname and given name
- Loki (disambiguation)
