= Lawrence H. Aller =

American astronomer (1913–2003)

- Born: 24 September 1913; Tacoma, Washington
- Died: 16 March 2003 (aged 89)
- Education: UC Berkeley; Harvard University
- Scientific career
- Institutions: University of Michigan; UCLA
- Notable students: James B. Kaler; William Liller; Benjamin F. Peery

Lawrence Hugh Aller (September 24, 1913 – March 16, 2003) was an American astronomer. He was born in Tacoma, Washington. He never finished high school and worked for a time as a gold miner. He received his bachelor's degree from the University of California, Berkeley in 1936 and went to graduate school at Harvard in 1937. There he obtained his master's degree in 1938 and his PhD in 1943. From 1943 to 1945 he worked on the Manhattan Project at the University of California Radiation Laboratory. He was an assistant professor at Indiana University from 1945 to 1948 and then an associate professor and professor at the University of Michigan until 1962. He moved to UCLA in 1962 and helped build its astronomy department. He was chair of the department from 1963 to 1968.

His work concentrated on the chemical composition of stars and nebulae. He was one of the first astronomers to argue that some differences in stellar and nebular spectra were caused by differences in their chemical composition. Aller wrote a number of books, including Atoms, Stars, and Nebulae, the third edition of which was published in 1991 (ISBN 0-521-32512-9). He published 346 research papers between 1935 and 2004.

He was elected to the American Academy of Arts and Sciences in 1961 and to the United States National Academy of Sciences in 1962. He won the Henry Norris Russell Lectureship in 1992.

His doctoral students include James B. Kaler and William Liller.

As of 2011, one of his three sons, Hugh Aller, was a professor and his daughter-in law, Margot Aller, a research scientist in the University of Michigan astronomy department. His granddaughter, Monique Aller, was previously a graduate student also in the University of Michigan astronomy department and teaches in the Physics and Astronomy Department at Georgia Southern University.
