= Dawn (McLaughlin novel) =

1981 novel by Dean McLaughlin

- First publication in Analog
- Author: Dean McLaughlin
- Cover artist: George Angelini
- Language: English
- Genre: Science fiction
- Publisher: Analog & Five Star
- Publication date: April 27, 1981 (mag.); November 15, 2006 (hc)
- Publication place: United States
- Media type: Magazine serial & Hardcover
- Pages: 307 (hc)
- ISBN: 978-1-59414-350-2
- OCLC: 70673204
- Dewey Decimal: 813/.6 22
- LC Class: PS3563.A31794 D39 2006

Dawn is a science fiction novel by American writer Dean McLaughlin. A re-imagining of Isaac Asimov's 1941 short story "Nightfall", it was serialized in Analog magazine (April – July 1981), with two cover illustrations, for both its first and last segments. The story was republished in hardcover in 2006.

== Plot ==
Dawn takes place on a nameless planet in a multiple-star system with six or seven stars, which are regarded as gods by the planet's inhabitants. The planet orbits around Alpher, a yellow star similar to Earth's sun, which forms a binary system with the smaller, cooler Bethe. The other four stars, Gamow, Dalton, Ephron, and Zwicky, are much farther away from Alpher and positioned in such a way that there is always at least one sun visible in the sky. The seventh "god" is the Pale One, which is either a large moon or a double planet. The orbits of the moon and stars are inclined enough that eclipses and occultations are rare events on the planet.

Since there is always at least one sun in the sky, the planet never experiences darkness, except in enclosed spaces such as caves or windowless rooms. The movements of Alpher from east to west across the sky serve as the primary units of time, while longer periods are marked by seasonal shifts of Alpher's position and the overtaking of one star by another. Hourglasses are used to measure shorter time intervals.

Isak, the protagonist of the story, is a young scribe living in the city of Center, a feudal society that resembles the culture of medieval Europe. Despite his limited education as a scholar, he discovers that a pendulum can be used to accurately measure long periods of time, such as the time between sunrises. Through his travels and knowledge of this discovery, Isak develops the skills to measure the cycles of the suns and formulates a theory to explain them.

Isak applies his theory to make accurate, long-term predictions of the movements of the "gods." He discovers a remarkable event: Gamow will soon overtake the Pale One and pass directly behind it, blocking its light. The overtaking will last for more than half a cycle, resulting in a prolonged period of darkness for the entire world.

Isak attempts to inform the priests of the Temple of Center of his prediction so that the people can prepare and avoid panic. However, both the people and the priests doubt Isak's claims about the gods. The high priests fear that if the people were to believe Isak's prediction, it would signal that the gods are angry with the priesthood and lead to societal unrest. As a result, they want to kill Isak before he can spread this foretelling.

Isak seeks refuge in a merchant's home and grows close to the merchant's pregnant daughter who was attacked by the priests who disguised their actions as a religious rite. Isak learns about the corruption of the ruling theocracy and sees an opportunity to overthrow them when his foretelling comes to fruition. Members of a secret rebellion adopt Isak as their spokesperson, and as time passes, he gains more supporters.

When the priests' guards come to take him captive, Isak's followers abandon him. He is then subjected to torture and ordered to renounce his beliefs, but he refuses and is taken to the top of a tower to be further tortured in front of the people, serving as a warning to those who dare to oppose the temple priests.

== Development history ==
McLaughlin pays homage to Asimov by naming the protagonist "Isak" and naming a historical figure Duke "Lagash", the name of the planet in "Nightfall". While Asimov simply used the Greek letters Alpha, Beta, Gamma, etc. to name the stars in his story, McLaughlin named his stars Alpher, Bethe, Gamow, Dalton, Ephron, and Zwicky. The first three are an allusion to the famous Alpha-Beta-Gamma paper written in 1948 by Ralph Alpher and George Gamow with Hans Bethe. Dalton and Zwicky are also famous scientists.

== See also ==
- Solar eclipses in fiction
