= Ó Lochlainn =

Ó Lochlainn and Ua Lochlainn are Irish surnames. They are patronymic forms of the personal name Lochlann. The surnames have been borne by several Irish families, such as the Uí Lochlainn, and the Meic Lochlainn.

A variant form of Ó Lochlainn is Ó Lachlainn. There are numerous Anglicised forms of Ó Lochlainn, such as: Laughlin, Lock, Locke, Loftus, Loughlin, O'Loghlen, O'Loghlin, O'Loughlan, and O'Loughlin.

== People with the surnames ==
=== Ó Lochlainn ===
- Colm Ó Lochlainn (1892–1972), printer, typographer, and traditional Irish Uilleann piper.

=== Ua Lochlainn ===
- Domnall Ua Lochlainn, High-King of Ireland.
- Muirchertach Mac Lochlainn, High-King of Ireland.
