= Ben Laughlin =

Ben Laughlin may refer to:

- Ben Laughlin (cricketer) (born 1982), Australian international cricketer
- Ben Laughlin (ten-pin bowler), professional bowler
- Ben Laughlin (baseball), 19th century professional baseball player
