= Lachlan McPherson =

Scottish footballer

Personal information
- Date of birth: 11 July 1900
- Place of birth: Dennistoun, Scotland
- Height: 5 ft 10 1/2 in (1.79 m)
- Positions: Left half; inside left

Senior career*
Years	Team	Apps	(Gls)
1919–1921	Cambuslang Rangers		
1921–1924	Notts County	32	(5)
1924–1930	Swansea Town	199	(29)
1930–1933	Everton	30	(1)
1933–1935	New Brighton	53	(3)
1935–1936	Hereford United		
1936–1937	Milford United		
Total		314	(38)

Managerial career
- 1935–1936: Hereford United
- * Club domestic league appearances and goals

Lachlan McPherson (born 11 July 1900) was a Scottish footballer who played as a left half or inside left.

== Career ==
Raised in the Springburn area of Glasgow, McPherson began his career as a teenager with Cambuslang Rangers in the Scottish junior leagues before moving south to English football; he never played for a senior Scottish club.

His longest spell was at Swansea Town where he spent five seasons, made 199 Football League appearances and helped the club to win the Third Division South and gain promotion in 1924–25, followed by a run to the semi-finals of the 1925–26 FA Cup.

Prior to his time at the Swans, McPherson had been with Notts County, playing a part in their Second Division title in 1922–23 – although subsequently he featured only five times in the top tier – and after his time in Wales he won the same medal again in 1930–31 with Everton. He had signed for the Toffees in January 1930 for a substantial £5,000 fee a few days after Swansea teammate Ben Williams made the same move, only for the team to be relegated five months later, recovering their top division status at the first time of asking.

Technically McPherson was still part of the Everton squad as they went straight on to win the First Division in 1931–32, but he only made three appearances in the campaign, and did not play first team football at Goodison Park for almost two years with his cause hampered by a serious knee injury, and interested clubs deterred by the high value placed on his transfer by the club due to a determination to recoup as much as possible of the fee they paid Swansea for his services. Eventually he went to Merseyside neighbours New Brighton in August 1933 for a small fraction of that earlier deal.

He later had a spell as player-manager of Hereford United, then competing in the semi-professional Birmingham & West Midlands League.
