= Locchi =

Locchi is an Italian surname. Notable people with the surname include:

- Giorgio Locchi (1923–1992), Italian journalist and writer
- Giuseppe "Pino" Locchi (1925–1994), Italian actor and voice actor
