= Jeanne O'Laughlin =

Co-Founder of Barry University

- Born: May 4, 1929; Detroit, Michigan, U.S.
- Died: June 19, 2019 (aged 90); Adrian, Michigan, U.S.
- Education: Doctorate in Educational Administration, Master of Science in Biology, Bachelor of Science in mathematics and biology
- Alma mater: University of Arizona, Siena Heights College
- Occupations: Co-founder and 5th president of Barry University
- Known for: Co-founding Barry University, civic activism, mediations in the Elián González custody dispute.

Jeanne O'Laughlin (May 4, 1929 – June 19, 2019) was an Adrian Dominican nun, an American educator, civic activist, and advocate for women, the homeless, and immigrants. She also sought reform within the Catholic Church, supporting women in the priesthood. Sister Jeanne co-founded Barry University in Miami Shores, Florida and served as its 5th president for 23 years. She was the first woman to be on the Orange Bowl Committee, first to win the Greater Miami Chamber of Commerce’s Sand in My Shoes Award, and first woman to be a member of the Non-Group. Sister Jeanne O'Laughlin was a mediator in the Elián González custody dispute, secured the release of 270 Haitian refugees seeking asylum from the Krome Detention Center by finding community housing sponsors, and supported Chinese refugees with housing during their pursuit of asylum in the United States.

== Barry University ==
O'Laughlin was hired as president at Barry University (known at the time as Barry College) in 1981, a women's college of 1,750 students and 340 employees. Over her 23 years as president, Sister Jeanne opened admissions to men, growing the student population to over 9,000 and expanding the number of employees to over 1,000. She raised over $171 million for the university and oversaw the construction of new campus buildings to accommodate the increase in university enrollment. As a result of her fundraising, Barry University expanded its number of buildings from 16 to 55. Barry’s budget also increased dramatically rising from $8. 3 million to a over $100 million. Barry’s endowment also rose more than 2,000 percent to $22 million during her latter 22 years as President. The university now offers seven doctoral degrees, including the only Doctor of Podiatric Medicine (DPM) degree in the Southeast, and only seven universities in the country to offer such a degree.

== Elián González Mediation ==
In 2000, Sister Jeanne O'Laughlin hosted a meeting at Barry University and served as a mediator over a custody dispute involving Elián González, between his Cuban father and his American grandparents in Miami, Florida. During the mediation she ultimately decided Elián should remain with his family in Miami, a decision which was ultimately not followed.
