= David O'Loughlin (rugby union) =

Irish rugby union player

- Full name: David Bonaventure O'Loughlin
- Born: 13 July 1916 Glenbeigh, Co. Kerry, Ireland
- Died: 17 July 1971 (aged 55) Glenbeigh, Co. Kerry, Ireland

Rugby union career
- Position: Lock
International career
Years	Team	Apps	(Points)
1938–39	Ireland	6	(3)

David Bonaventure O'Loughlin (13 July 1916 — 17 July 1971) was an Irish international rugby union player.

Born in Glenbeigh, Co. Kerry, O'Loughlin was educated at Blackrock College and University College Cork (UCC).

O'Loughlin, a second row forward, won three Munster Senior Cup titles with UCC and was selected from the varsity side by Ireland in 1938, making his debut against England at Lansdowne Road. He gained six Ireland caps and later played for Dolphin, where he won a further two Munster Senior Cups, as well as Limerick club Garryowen.

After retiring, O'Loughlin was a IRFU selector and coached UCC to the 1963 Munster Senior Cup title.

O'Loughlin's grandson Paddy is a Limerick inter-county level hurler.

== See also ==
- List of Ireland national rugby union players
