= McLaughlin (Martian crater) =

McLaughlin Crater
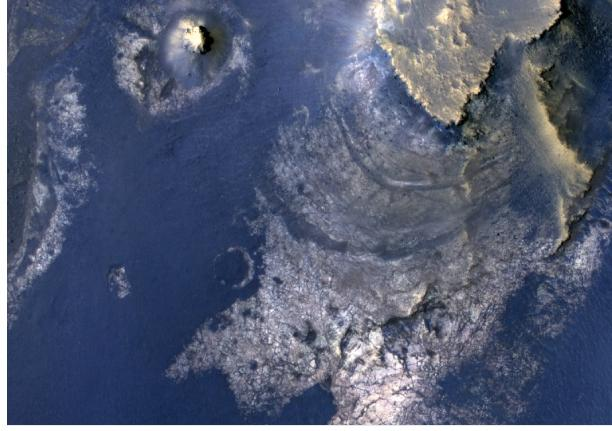
- McLaughlin Crater viewed from orbit - small 0.550 km (0.342 mi) portion of 90.92 km (56.50 mi) diameter crater floor is shown - (MRO, HiRISE) (January, 2013).
- Planet: Mars
- Region: Oxia Palus quadrangle
- Coordinates: 21.9°N 337.63°E
- Quadrangle: Oxia Palus
- Diameter: 90.92 km (56.50 mi)
- Depth: 2.2 km (1.4 mi)
- Eponym: Dean B. McLaughlin, American astronomer (1901-1965). (IAU, 1973).

McLaughlin Crater is an old crater in the Oxia Palus quadrangle of Mars, located at 21.9°N 337.63°E. It is 90.92 km (56.50 mi) in diameter and 2.2 km (1.4 mi) deep. The crater was named after Dean B. McLaughlin, an American astronomer (1901-1965). The Mars Reconnaissance Orbiter has found evidence that the water came from beneath the surface between 3.7 billion and 4 billion years ago and remained long enough to make carbonate-related clay minerals found in layers. McLaughlin Crater, one of the deepest craters on Mars, contains Mg-Fe clays and carbonates that probably formed in a groundwater-fed alkaline lake. This type of lake could have had a massive biosphere of microscopic organisms.

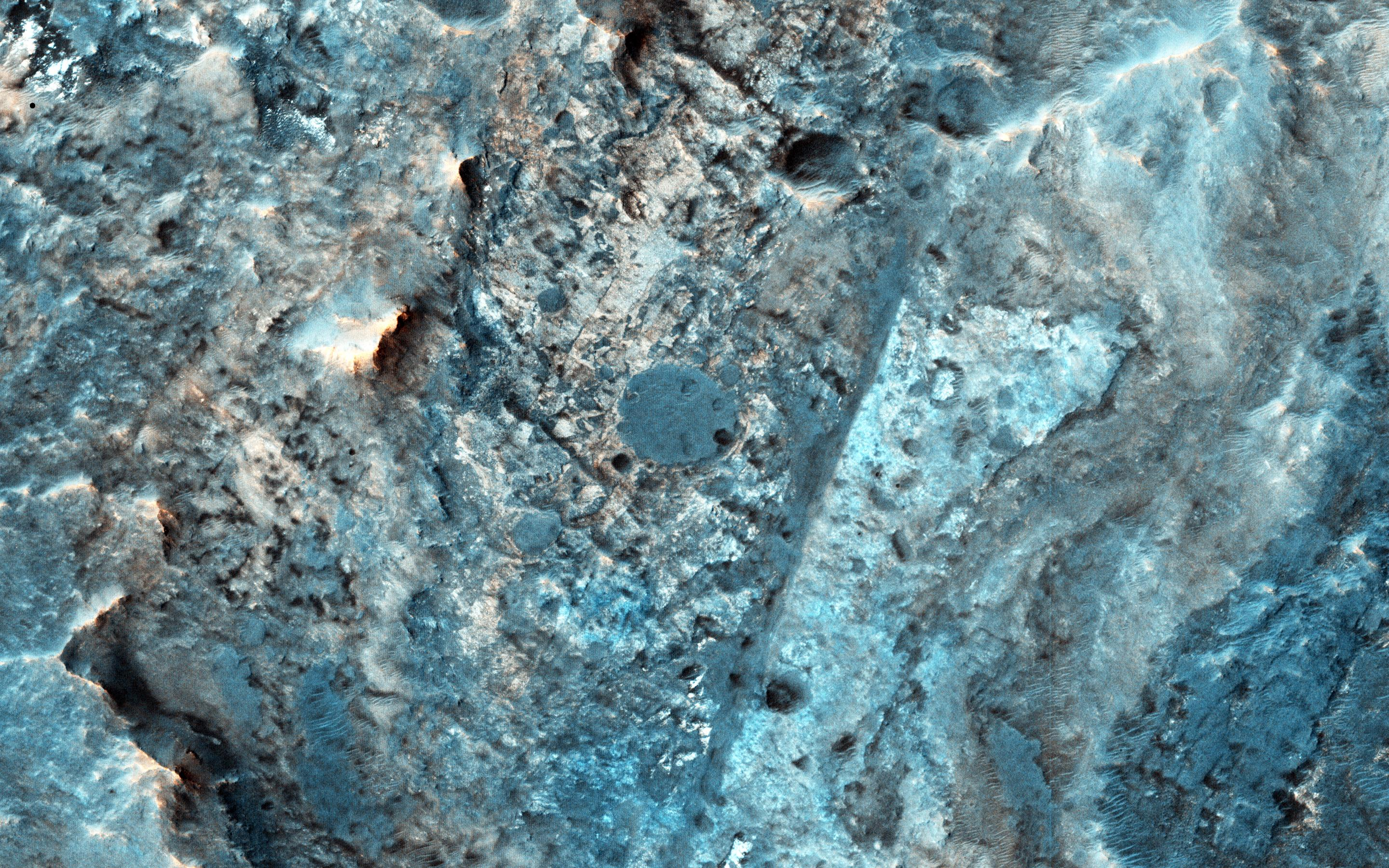
McLaughlin crater - close-up (released 14 January 2016).

== See also ==
- 2024 McLaughlin, minor planet
- Climate of Mars
- Impact crater
- List of craters on Mars
- McLaughlin (lunar crater)
- Water on Mars
