= John Wallace de Beque Farris =

Canadian lawyer and politician (1878–1970)

The Honourable John Wallace de Beque Farris QC
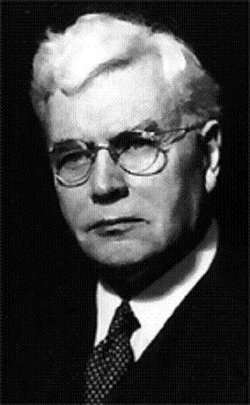

Canadian Senator from British Columbia
- In office 1937–1970
- Appointed by: William Lyon Mackenzie King

Attorney General and Minister of Labour, British Columbia
- In office 1917–1922

Member of the Legislative Assembly of British Columbia for Vancouver City
- In office 1916–1924

10th President of the Canadian Bar Association
- In office 1937–1938
- Preceded by: Henry Hague Davis
- Succeeded by: Louis-Émery Beaulieu, K.C.

President of the Law Society of British Columbia

Personal details
- Born: December 3, 1878 White's Cove, New Brunswick, Canada
- Died: February 25, 1970 (aged 91) Vancouver, British Columbia, Canada
- Party: Liberal
- Spouse: Evlyn Fenwick Farris
- Relations: Laughlin Farris (father); John Ferris (grandfather)
- Children: 4, including John
- Cabinet: Provincial: Attorney General (1917-1922); Minister of Labour (1917-1922); President of the Executive Council (1917)
- Committees: Chair, Standing Committee on Banking and Commerce (1949-1950)

John Wallace de Beque Farris, QC (December 3, 1878 – February 25, 1970) was a Canadian lawyer and politician.

== Background ==
Born in White's Cove, New Brunswick, the son of Laughlin P. Farris and Louise Hay, he was educated at St. Martin's Seminary, received his Bachelor of Arts from Acadia University and received his Bachelor of Law from the University of Pennsylvania.

In 1905, Farris married Evlyn Fenwick Keirstead of Windsor, Nova Scotia. They had four children : Katherine Hay, Donald Fenwick, Ralph Keirstead and John Lauchlan.

He was called to the British Columbia Bar in 1903. He founded the law firm now called Farris LLP and was the first prosecutor of Vancouver, British Columbia.

In 1907, he ran unsuccessfully for the Legislative Assembly of British Columbia for the riding of Vancouver. He lost again in 1909 for the riding of Richmond.

He was elected in 1916 as a Liberal MLA for the riding of Vancouver and was re-elected in 1920. From 1917 to 1922, he was the Attorney General and Minister of Labour. He was defeated in the 1924 provincial election.

Farris was active in the Canadian Bar Association, serving as President in 1937-38. He also served as Treasurer (chief elected officer) of the Law Society of British Columbia from 1934 to 1938.

In the 1930s and 1940s, Farris was instrumental in raising funds and persuading the provincial government to create the Faculty of Law at the University of British Columbia.

Along with Nathan Nemetz, KC, Farris was the successful counsel in an appeal to the Judicial Committee of the Privy Council: White v Kuzych, a significant labour law case. Farris and Nemetz acted for White, the leader of the Boilermakers and Iron Shipbuilders Union, in a dispute with a union member, Myron Kuzych.

In 1937, Farris was appointed to the Senate of Canada representing the senatorial division of Vancouver South, British Columbia. He served until his death in 1970. Late in life, he was known within the Liberal Party as a staunch supporter of Pierre Trudeau's leadership and an opponent of Senate reform.
