= McLaughlin (lunar crater) =

Crater on the Moon

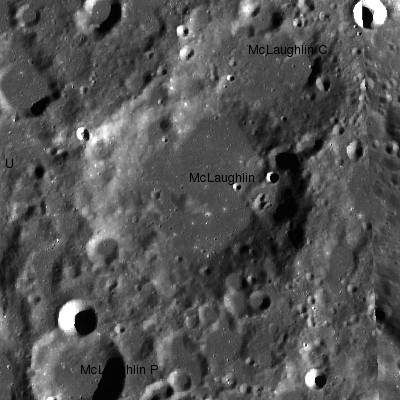
- LRO image
- Coordinates: 47.01°N 92.83°W
- Diameter: 75.29 km (46.78 mi)
- Depth: Unknown
- Colongitude: 94° at sunrise
- Formation: Imbrian=
- Eponym: Dean B. McLaughlin

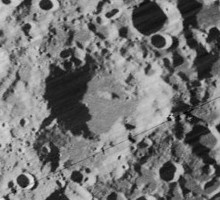
Oblique view facing south

McLaughlin is a lunar impact crater that is located just behind the northwestern rim on the far side of the Moon. This portion of the surface is sometimes brought into view of the Earth due to libration, and the area can then be viewed from a low angle under favorable lighting conditions. McLaughlin lies to the west-southwest of the crater Galvani. About two crater diameters due west lies Rynin.

This formation dates to the Imbrian period on the lunar geologic timescale. It is a heavily eroded crater with an irregular rim that is mark by a number of smaller impacts. The interior floor is generally level, except for a low right offset to the southeast of the midpoint, and some irregularities near the southwest and northern inner walls. The interior is marked by several tiny craterlets.

Prior to formal naming by the IAU in 1970, McLaughlin was called Crater 108.

== Satellite craters ==
By convention these features are identified on lunar maps by placing the letter on the side of the crater midpoint that is closest to McLaughlin.

McLaughlin	Latitude	Longitude	Diameter
A	51.6° N	92.4° W	35 km
B	50.2° N	91.2° W	43 km
C	48.5° N	91.9° W	60 km
P	45.0° N	94.6° W	34 km
U	47.2° N	97.0° W	30 km
Z	52.6° N	92.8° W	21 km

== See also ==
- 2024 McLaughlin, minor planet
- McLaughlin (Martian crater)
