= Nathaniel Nemetz =

Canadian lawyer and judge (1913–1997)

Nathan Nemetz
- Nemetz in 1990
- Born: Nathaniel Theodore Nemetz; September 8, 1913; Winnipeg, Manitoba
- Died: October 21, 1997 (aged 84)
- Occupations: lawyer and judge
- Awards: Order of Canada; Order of British Columbia

Nathaniel Theodore (Nathan) Nemetz, CC OBC QC (September 8, 1913 – October 21, 1997) was a Canadian lawyer and judge.

Born in Winnipeg, Manitoba, he moved with his family to Vancouver when he was 10. He received a BA from the University of British Columbia in 1934 and was called to the British Columbia Bar in 1937.

In 1951, along with Senator John W. de B. Farris, KC, Nemetz was the successful counsel in an appeal to the Judicial Committee of the Privy Council: White v Kuzych, a significant labour law case. Farris and Nemetz acted for White, the leader of the Boilermakers and Iron Shipbuilders Union, in a dispute with a union member, Myron Kuzych.

He was made a Justice of the Supreme Court of British Columbia in 1963 and a Justice of the Court of Appeal in 1968. In 1973, he became Chief Justice of the Supreme Court of British Columbia and was appointed Chief Justice of British Columbia in 1979. He retired in 1988. He was Chancellor of the University of British Columbia from 1972 to 1975.

In 1989 he was made a Companion of the Order of Canada. In 1990 he was awarded the Order of British Columbia. He was awarded honorary doctorates from Tel Aviv University (1991) and the University of British Columbia (1975).

Academic offices
| Preceded by Allan M. McGavin | Chancellor of the University of British Columbia; 1971–1975 | Succeeded by Donovan F. Miller |
