= Evlyn Fenwick Farris =

Canadian scholar and women's rights activist

Evlyn Fenwick Farris (21 August 1878 – 5 November 1971) was a scholar and advocate for continuing education and women's rights. She was the founder of the first University Women's Club of Vancouver, and was elected to the Senate of the University of British Columbia.

== Early life and education ==
Evlyn Fenwick Farris was born Evlyn Keirstead in Windsor, Nova Scotia to Mary Jane Fenwick and Miles Kierstead, a Baptist Minister. Her mother and newborn brother died in 1890 of tuberculosis and bronchitis.

In 1892, Evlyn entered Horton Collegial Academy, a Baptist high school. In 1894, she began her studies at Acadia College (now Acadia University) in Wolfville, Nova Scotia. At Acadia College, she began to write about the role of women in society and her strong beliefs that women and men should have the same access to education.

In 1905, she married and moved to British Columbia with John Wallace de Beque Farris, a Vancouver lawyer and politician.

== University Women's Club of Vancouver ==
In 1907 Evlyn Fenwick Farris helped found the University Women's Club of Vancouver (UWCV), a social club for university-educated women and became its first President. The UWCV encouraged the founding of a provincial university and promoted a variety of socially progressive causes.

== University of British Columbia ==
In 1917 Evlyn Fenwick Farris became the first woman in Canada to be appointed to the board of governors of a university — a founding governor of the University of British Columbia. She was also the first woman to be appointed to the UBC Senate. Active in its formation, the University Women's Club of Vancouver considered UBC as its "godchild".
