= Lachlan =

Lachlan may refer to:

== People ==
- Lachlan (name), masculine name

== Places ==
- Several places in New South Wales, Australia, named for Lachlan Macquarie. For a more complete list, see Places named after Macquarie
  - Electoral district of Lachlan, an electoral district of the Legislative Assembly in New South Wales, Australia
  - Electoral district of Lachlan and Lower Darling, an electoral district of the Legislative Assembly in New South Wales, Australia
  - Lachlan River, a river in central New South Wales, Australia
  - Lachlan Shire, a local government area in the central west of New South Wales, Australia
  - Lachlan Valley Railway, a rail preservation society based at Cowra, New South Wales, Australia
  - Lachlan Valley Way, a state highway in New South Wales, Australia
  - Upper Lachlan Shire, a local government area in the state of New South Wales, Australia
- Lachlan, Tasmania, a locality
- Lachlan Fold Belt
- Lachlan Island

== Other ==
- Clan Maclachlan, a Scottish clan which is sometimes known as Clan Lachlan
- HMAS Lachlan (K364), a River-class frigate that served the Royal Australian Navy
- Young Lachlan, a schooner that was stolen and wrecked by convicts in 1819
