= Dean Benjamin McLaughlin =

American astronomer

Dean Benjmain McLaughlin
- Born: 25 October 1901; Brooklyn, New York City
- Died: 8 December 1965 (aged 64); Ann Arbor, Michigan
- Education: University of Michigan
- Spouse: Laura Elizabeth Hill Mclaughlin
- Scientific career
- Workplaces: University of Michigan
- Thesis: Spectrographic Studies of Eclipsing Binaries (1927)
- Notable students: Benjamin F. Peery

Dean Benjamin McLaughlin (born October 25, 1901, Brooklyn, New York City; died December 8, 1965, Ann Arbor, Michigan, US) was an American astronomer. He was a professor of astronomy at the University of Michigan. He was the father of the science fiction author Dean B. McLaughlin, Jr.

== Biography ==
Born in Brooklyn, New York, McLaughlin received his B.S. (1923), his M.S. (1924) and his Ph.D. (1927) all from Michigan. His doctorate was awarded with a thesis titled, Spectrographic Studies of Eclipsing Binaries. McLaughlin married fellow astronomer Laura Elizabeth Hill in 1927.

McLaughlin was a professor at the University of Michigan for 38 years during which time he served as the doctoral advisor for other notable astronomers including Elizabeth Cornwall Tilley and Benjamin F. Peery.

In 1954, he proposed the theory that there are volcanoes on Mars and that their eruptions change the albedo features called "mare" (The Martian equivalent of Lunar mare). His proposal was partially confirmed in 1971 with the arrival of Mariner 9, which showed that strong winds could move dust around the planet, creating the changes of appearance formerly attributed to some kind of vegetation.

A crater on Mars was named in his honor, as is the crater McLaughlin on the far side of the Moon and the asteroid 2024 McLaughlin. In 2014 NASA scientists announced they had discovered evidence of water in Mars' McLaughlin Crater.

== See also ==
- Richard Alfred Rossiter
- Rossiter–McLaughlin effect
