= Harold J. O'Loughlin =

American politician (1900–1968)

Harold J. O'Loughlin (November 30, 1900 – March 27, 1968) was an American businessman, lawyer, and politician.

Loughlin was born in Portland, Oregon. He graduated from University of St. Thomas and received his law degree from the University of Minnesota Law School. O'Loughlin lived in Saint Paul, Minnesota with his wife and family and practiced law in Saint Paul. He also was an assistant editor of the Catholic Digest and served as a lawyer for the United States Federal Land Bank. O'Loughlin served in the Minnesota Senate from 1955 to 1962 and was a Democrat.
