= 2024 McLaughlin =

Asteroid on the inner regions of the Asteroid belt

Discovery
- Discovered by: Indiana University (Indiana Asteroid Program)
- Discovery site: Goethe Link Obs.
- Discovery date: 23 October 1952

Designations
- Named after: Dean B. McLaughlin (American astronomer)
- Alternative designations: 1952 UR · 1938 WP; 1982 BX_{4}
- Minor planet category: main-belt · Vesta

Orbital characteristics
- Epoch 4 September 2017 (JD 2458000.5)
- Uncertainty parameter 0
- Observation arc: 78.35 yr (28,619 days)
- Aphelion: 2.6479 AU
- Perihelion: 2.0019 AU
- Semi-major axis: 2.3249 AU
- Eccentricity: 0.1389
- Orbital period (sidereal): 3.54 yr (1,295 days)
- Mean anomaly: 126.79°
- Mean motion: 0° 16^{m} 40.8^{s} / day
- Inclination: 7.3117°
- Longitude of ascending node: 69.231°
- Argument of perihelion: 291.34°

Physical characteristics
- Dimensions: 7.915±0.079
- Geometric albedo: 0.173±0.020
- Absolute magnitude (H): 12.9

2024 McLaughlin, provisional designation 1952 UR, is an asteroid from the inner regions of the asteroid belt, approximately 8 kilometer in diameter. It was discovered 23 October 1952, by the Indiana Asteroid Program at Goethe Link Observatory near Brooklyn, Indiana, and named after American astronomer Dean Benjamin McLaughlin.

== Orbit and classification ==
McLaughlin orbits the Sun in the inner main-belt at a distance of 2.0–2.6 AU once every 3 years and 6 months (1,295 days). Its orbit has an eccentricity of 0.14 and an inclination of 7° with respect to the ecliptic.

The asteroid was first identified as 1938 WP at the Finnish Turku Observatory in 1938, extending the body's observation arc by 14 years prior to its official discovery observation.

== Physical characteristics ==
According to the survey carried out by NASA's Wide-field Infrared Survey Explorer with its subsequent NEOWISE mission, the asteroid measures 7.9 kilometers in diameter and its surface has an albedo of 0.173.

As of 2017, McLaughlin's composition, rotation period and shape remain unknown.

== Naming ==
This minor planet was named in memory of American astronomer and geologist Dean Benjamin McLaughlin (1901–1965).

McLaughlin was an astronomical spectroscopist at Swarthmore College and the University of Michigan, and was the first to thoroughly measure stellar rotation, most notably the rotation of Algol. As a geologist he was one of the first to interpret the telescopically observable markings on Mars, which were later confirmed by direct observations from spacecraft (also see Albedo features). The lunar and Martian crater McLaughlin are also named in his honour. The official naming citation was published by the Minor Planet Center on 6 June 1982 (M.P.C. 6955).
