= Laughlin Farris =

Canadian politician

- Born: Laughlin P. Farris; December 23, 1843; Whites Cove, New Brunswick, British North America
- Died: December 9, 1925 (aged 81)
- Other names: Laughlan or Lauchlan Farris
- Occupation(s): farmer, political figure
- Known for: member, Legislative Assembly of New Brunswick
- Spouse: Louise Hay
- Children: John Wallace de Beque Farris
- Parents: John Farris (father); Sarah McLean (mother)

Laughlin P. Farris (December 23, 1843 – December 9, 1925) was a farmer and political figure in New Brunswick, Canada. He represented Queen's County in the Legislative Assembly of New Brunswick from 1892 to 1908 as a Liberal member. His first name also appears as Laughlan or Lauchlan in some sources.

He was born in Whites Cove, New Brunswick, the son of John Farris and Sarah McLean, and educated in Fredericton. Farris married Louise Hay. He served on the province's Executive Council as a minister without portfolio and then as Commissioner for Agriculture.

His son John Wallace de Beque Farris served in the Legislative Assembly of British Columbia and the Canadian Senate.

== Sources ==
- Canadian Parliamentary Guide, 1908, EJ Chambers
