= Mac Lochlainn =

The Mac Lochlainn (Irish pronunciation: [mˠək ˈl̪ˠɔxl̪ˠən̠ʲ]) were a leading branch of the Cenél nEógain and during the early medieval period, the most powerful clan in the Northern Uí Néill. They descended from Domnall Dabaill (died 915), son of Áed Findliath. Another son of the latter was Niall Glúndub eponymous ancestor of the Ua Néill. As a result of their descent from Domnall Dabaill, the Mac Lochlainn were known as Clann Domnaill or Clann Domhnaill. The eponym behind the surnames Mac Lochlainn and Ó Lochlainn (Ua Lochlainn),—is Lochlann mac Máelsechnaill, King of Inishowen (died 1023). The surnames themselves formed not as a result of Lochlann's prominence, but as a consequence of the remarkable success of his grandson, Domnall Ua Lochlainn (died 1121).

Domnall ruled as High King of Ireland for twenty years. He was succeeded in the kingship of Tír nEógain by his son, Niall. Domnall's grandson, Muirchertach (died 1166), also ruled as High King of Ireland. Following the latter's death, the power of the Meic Lochlainn was lost. Following the English conquest of Ulaid by John de Courcy (died c. 1219), Muirchertach's son, Niall (died 1176), assisted the Ulaid against the conquerors. In 1215, Áed Mac Lochlainn was slain battling the Uí Catháin, a rising kindred in what is today County Londonderry.

In 1235, Domnall Mac Lochlainn wrenched the kingship of Tír nEógain from an Ua Néill incumbent he slew. Although Domnall had success against the English, he was later utterly defeated by Brian Ua Néill and Máelsechnaill Ua Domnaill, King of Tír Conaill. The virtual extirpation of the Meic Lochlainn leadership at this defeat meant that the family was finally eclipsed by the rival Ua Néill kindred. Although there are later recorded Meic Lochlainn chieftains, the diminished family lost the lordship of their Inishowen homeland, which in turn came to be possessed by the Ua Dochartaigh kindred. In 1601, two members of the Meic Lochlann are noted in Inishowen: Hugh Carrogh, described as "chief of his sept", who held Carrickmaquigley Castle; and Brian Óg, who held Garnigall Castle.

== People ==
=== Mac Lochlainn ===
- Muirchertach Mac Lochlainn, 12th-century Irish king
- Niall Mac Lochlainn, 12th-century Irish king
- Pádraig Mac Lochlainn, 21st-century Irish politician
- Tadhg Mac Lochlainn, 20th-century Irish historian
- Gerry MacLochlainn, 21st-century Irish politician
- Úna MacLochlainn, 21st-century Irish singer-songwriter

== See also ==
- Ó Lochlainn
- McLaughlin
- McLoughlin
