= McLauchlan =

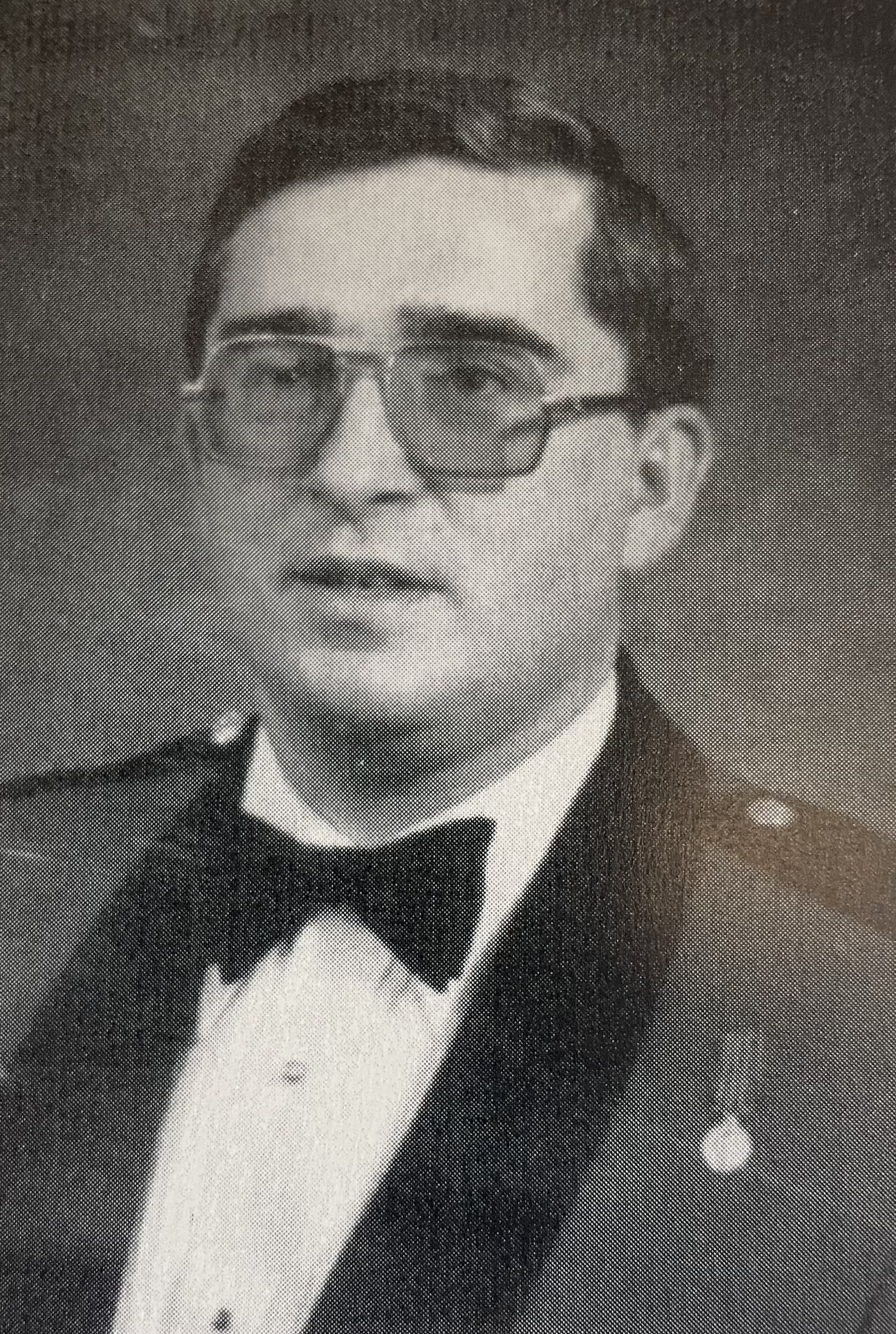
Colonel J R W McLauchlan, SDG Highlanders

McLauchlan is a surname. Notable people with the surname include:

- Billy McLauchlan (1950–1972), Scottish footballer
- Gerry McLauchlan (born 1989), Scottish footballer
- Ian McLauchlan (1942–2025), Scottish rugby union player
- Lee McLauchlan (born 1979), Australian hockey player
- Lucy McLauchlan, English artist
- Murray McLauchlan (born 1948), Canadian musician
- Tracey McLauchlan (born 1979), New Zealand table tennis player
- Tui McLauchlan (1915–2004), New Zealand artist
