= John McLaughlin =

John or Jon McLaughlin may refer to:

== Arts and entertainment ==
- John McLaughlin (musician) (born 1942), English jazz fusion guitarist, member of Mahavishnu Orchestra
- Jon McLaughlin (musician) (born 1982), American singer-songwriter
- John McLaughlin (artist) (1898–1976), California hard-edge painter
- "John McLaughlin", a song on the Miles Davis album Bitches Brew
- John McLaughlin, co-writer of the 2010 film Black Swan

== Politics ==
- John McLaughlin (Ontario politician) (1849–1911), politician in Ontario, Canada
- John McLaughlin (Alberta politician) (1905–1991), provincial level politician from Alberta, Canada
- John McLaughlin (Australian politician) (1850–1918), New South Wales politician
- John E. McLaughlin (born 1942), former deputy director and acting director of the Central Intelligence Agency
- John McLaughlin (host) (1927–2016), political commentator, host of The McLaughlin Group

== Sports ==
- John McLaughlin (American football) (born 1975), American football defensive end
- John McLaughlin (footballer, born 1890), Scottish footballer who played for Hamilton Academical and Morton
- John McLaughlin (footballer, born 1936), Scottish footballer who played for Clyde, Greenock Morton, Millwall, Dunfermline Athletic and Motherwell
- John McLaughlin (footballer, born 1944) (1944–2011), Scottish footballer who played for Queen's Park
- John McLaughlin (footballer, born 1948), Scottish footballer who played for Falkirk, Everton, and the Seattle Sounders
- John McLaughlin (footballer, born 1952), English footballer who played for Liverpool and Portsmouth
- John McLaughlin (footballer, born 1954), English footballer who played for Colchester United, Swindon Town and Portsmouth
- Jon McLaughlin (footballer) (born 1987), Scottish footballer, Rangers goalkeeper

== Others ==
- John Fletcher McLaughlin (1863–1933), theologian
- John J. McLaughlin (1865–1914), founder of the Canada Dry brand of soft drinks
- John N. McLaughlin (1918–2002), United States Marine Corps general and POW
- John C. McLaughlin (1921–2013), professor of English and linguistics at the University of Iowa
- John McLaughlin (pollster), American political consultant and pollster

== See also ==
- John McCloughlin (born 1958), Irish lawn and carpet bowler
- John McLoughlin (disambiguation)
- John MacLaughlin (disambiguation)
- John McLachlan (disambiguation)
- John Laughlin (disambiguation)
