= Jack O'Loughlin =

Jack O'Loughlin may refer to:

- Jack O'Loughlin (Australian footballer) (1873–1960)
- Jack O'Loughlin (baseball) (born 2000)
- John O'Loughlin (disambiguation), multiple people
