= John MacLaughlin =

John MacLaughlin may refer to:

- John MacLaughlin (fencer)
- John MacLaughlin (priest)

== See also ==
- John McLaughlin (disambiguation)
- John MacLoughlin, Irish politician
- John McLoughlin (disambiguation)
