= Paul Goldstein =

Paul Goldstein may refer to:

- Paul Goldstein (law professor) (born 1943), law professor at Stanford Law School
- Paul Goldstein (tennis) (born 1976), American tennis player
