= Nordic people =

Nordic people may refer to:

- People who inhabit the Nordic countries of Denmark, Finland, Iceland, Norway and Sweden
- North Germanic peoples or Scandinavians, a group of related ethnic groups originating in the Nordic countries
- Nordic race, a historical race concept largely covering populations of Northern Europe
