= W. Hugenholtz =

Dutch lawyer and activist (1902–1969)

- Born: Willem Hugenholtz; 11 May 1902; Axel, Netherlands
- Died: 11 May 1969 (aged 67); Leiden, Netherlands
- Other name: Wim Hugenholtz
- Occupations: Lawyer; activist
- Years active: c. 1916–1968
- Known for: Animal welfare activism
- Spouses: Anny Geertruida Margaretha van Velzen Camphuis (m. 1934; div. 1935) Maria Catharina de Kruiff (m. 1960)
- Father: Johannes Hugenholtz
- Family: Hugenholtz
- Awards: Knight of the Order of the Netherlands Lion; Officer of the Order of Orange-Nassau

Willem "Wim" Hugenholtz (11 May 1902 – 8 April 1969) was a Dutch lawyer and animal welfare activist. He founded and served as president of the World Federation for the Protection of Animals, established in 1950. He also worked on proposals for animal protection legislation in the Netherlands and internationally.

== Biography ==
=== Early life ===
Willem Hugenholtz was born in Axel, Netherlands, on 11 May 1902. His father, Johannes Hugenholtz (1859–1922), was a minister, and his mother was Hermina Geesink. He was the youngest brother of Gerhard W. K. Hugenholtz (1889–1969). From the age of 14, he wrote articles on animal protection for magazines including the Haagse Post.

=== Legal career ===
In 1928, Hugenholtz established himself as a lawyer and attorney in Leiden.

=== Animal welfare activism ===
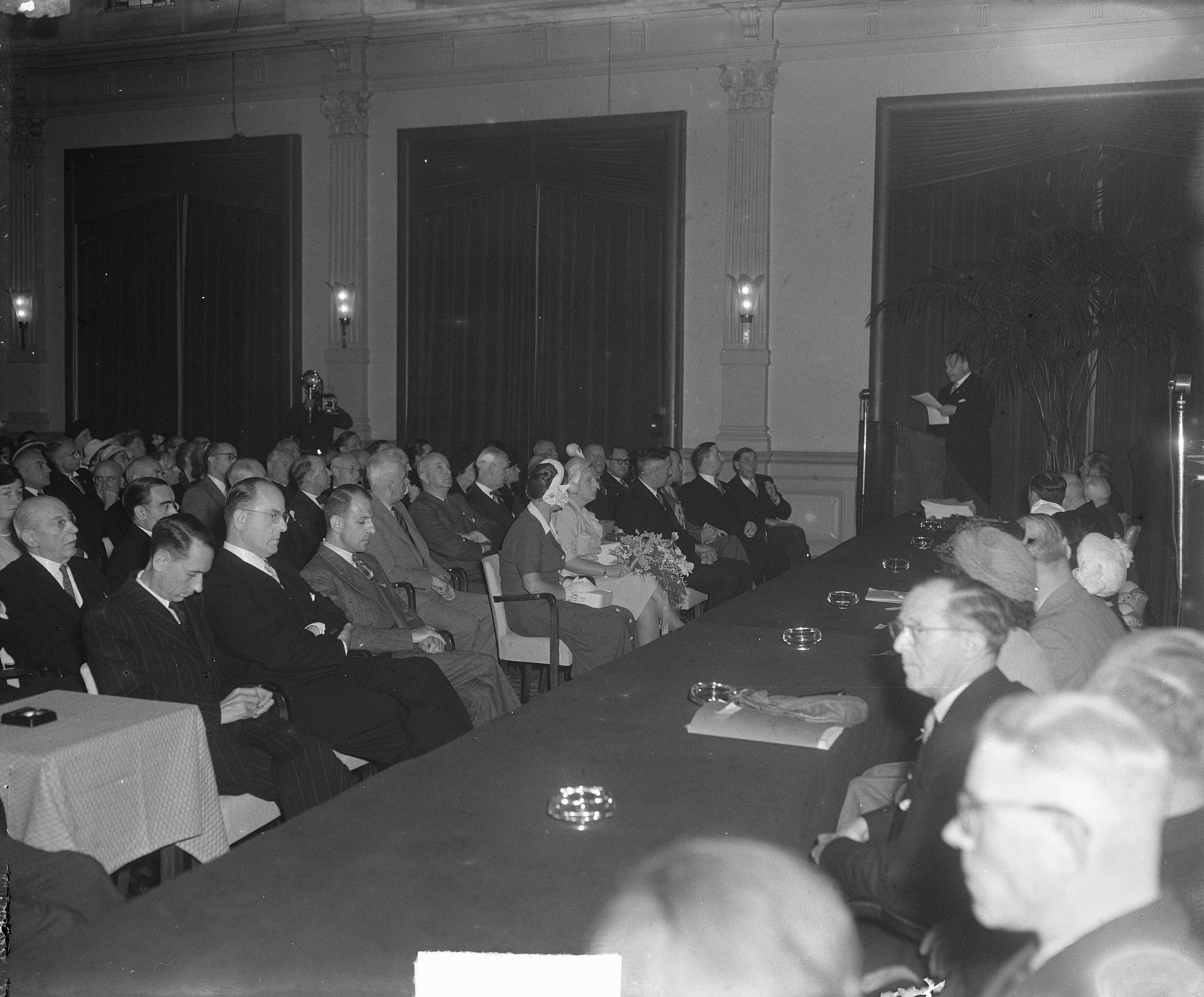
World Congress on Animal Protection, 1950

In 1950, Hugenholtz initiated the first world congress for animal protection, held in Scheveningen. The congress was attended by Queen Juliana, ambassadors, and 250 representatives from 40 countries. At the congress, he founded the World Federation for the Protection of Animals and served as its president for eight years. According to the Hugenholtz family website, the federation came to include thousands of animal protection organisations worldwide. It later merged with the International Society for the Prevention of Cruelty to Animals to become World Animal Protection.

In 1952, as president of the World Federation, he drafted a proposal for a "World Animal Protection Act", which was sent to governments in several countries. He resigned as president at the second international congress in Zurich in 1958 and was appointed honorary president.

In October 1951, Hugenholtz proposed a draft for a national animal protection law, which was informally submitted to Minister of Justice Hendrik Mulderije. According to the Hugenholtz family website, the interdepartmental committee and the government draft law adopted about seventy percent of his proposals. During parliamentary discussions, several members of the Dutch House of Representatives and Senate referred to his work. In 1961, Minister of Justice Albert Beerman acknowledged his role in the legislation.

Hugenholtz was a long-time board member of the Dutch Society for the Protection of Animals and served as its chairman from 1954. He was also a patron of the Scottish Society for Prevention of Cruelty to Animals and an honorary member of several foreign national animal protection organisations.

=== Other activities ===
Hugenholtz was interested in the history of Zeeland. He founded the Vereniging van Vrienden van Veere ("Association of Friends of Veere"), a historical society concerned with Zeeland and the town of Veere. Veere appointed him city lawyer.

=== Honours and recognition ===
Hugenholtz was appointed a Knight of the Order of the Netherlands Lion on 18 October 1961 and was also an Officer of the Order of Orange-Nassau.

=== Personal life and death ===
On 14 June 1934, Hugenholtz married Anny Geertruida Margaretha van Velzen Camphuis; the marriage ended in divorce the following year. He married Maria Catharina de Kruiff (1931–2018) on 27 December 1960.

Hugenholtz died on 8 April 1969 in Leiden from a cerebral infarction. His funeral was held at the Groene Kerkje in Oegstgeest on 12 April, and he was buried at the cemetery there.

== Publications ==
Hugenholtz published works on law, including:

- Hoofdlijnen van het Nederlands Burgerlijk Procesrecht ("Main Lines of Dutch Civil Procedural Law")
- Over Reconventie ("On Counterclaim")
- Over Reële Executie ("About Real Execution")
- Naar Nieuw Burgerlijk Procesrecht? ("Towards New Civil Procedure Law?")
- De wet op de dierenbescherming ("The Animal Protection Act"; Leiden, 1961)

== See also ==
- Animal welfare and rights in the Netherlands
