= John O'Loughlin =

John O'Loughlin may refer to:

- John O'Loughlin (dual player) (born 1989), Irish Gaelic footballer and hurler from County Laois
- John Patrick O'Loughlin (1911–1985), bishop of the Roman Catholic Diocese of Darwin
- Jack O'Loughlin (Australian footballer) (John Joseph O'Loughlin; 1873–1960), Australian rules footballer

== See also ==
- John Loughlin (disambiguation)
