= Malvina Mehrn =

Danish animal rights and welfare activist (1862–1960)

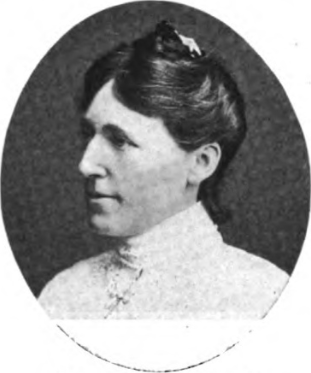
- Mehrn in 1914
- Born: Malvina Brix; 22 March 1862; Foulum, Viborg, Denmark
- Died: 13 December 1960 (aged 98); Copenhagen, Denmark
- Occupation(s): Animal rights and welfare activist
- Years active: 1897–1940s
- Known for: Chairpersonship of Svalen; advocacy for the Danish Animal Protection Act
- Spouse: Lauritz Johan Thorvald Sørensen Mehrn (m. 1886; died 1923)
- Children: 2

Malvina Mehrn (née Brix; 22 March 1862 – 13 December 1960) was a Danish animal rights and welfare activist. As chairperson of the organisation Svalen from 1906 to 1920, she helped expand its focus from bird protection to broader animal welfare issues and worked to strengthen cooperation between humane and women's movements. Mehrn advocated for legal protection of animals, contributed to the passage of the Danish Animal Protection Act of 1916, and organised the 1911 International Animal Protection Congress in Copenhagen.

== Early and personal life ==
Malvina Brix was born on 22 March 1862 in Foulum, Viborg, to parish priest Jens Bøgild Brix (1815–1877) and Anne Marie Nørschau (1821–1904). She was one of 14 children. The family faced financial difficulties, and the children were raised in modest circumstances.

On 16 November 1886, she married Lauritz Johan Thorvald Sørensen Mehrn (1846–1923), who had aspired to become an artist but, under pressure from his father, entered the army instead. The couple had two daughters, Laura (born 1888) and Anne Marie (born 1889). In 1906, the family moved from Viborg to Copenhagen.

== Activism ==
Mehrn joined the bird protection organisation Svalen shortly after its founding in 1897, serving as its secretary and treasurer. Before her death in 1905, the organisation's founder, Camilla Eegholm, nominated Mehrn as her successor, believing that her decisiveness, gentleness, and sense of duty would benefit the society. Mehrn was officially elected chairperson on 6 February 1906. Her husband also joined Svalen's board as treasurer and designed the organisation's emblem.

As leader of Svalen, Mehrn gradually broadened its focus from bird protection to general animal welfare. She viewed the emancipation of animals as comparable to that of enslaved people and argued that animals, as voiceless sentient beings, required legal protection through established rights. To advance this aim, she focused on improving legislation and promoting a coordinated international approach to animal protection.

At the 1909 International Animal Protection Congress in London, Mehrn proposed that the next meeting be held in Copenhagen. The congress took place from 1 to 5 August 1911 at the Hotel d'Angleterre in Copenhagen and was the largest event ever organised by Svalen. It focused on issues such as humane slaughter and the abolition of vivisection.

Mehrn sought the support of women's rights movements for her animal welfare initiatives. In 1915, Svalen was admitted to the Women's Council in Denmark, and Mehrn encouraged its members to use their newly acquired voting rights to advance animal protection causes. The following year, in 1916, the Danish Animal Protection Act was adopted, partly as a result of Svalen's campaigning. Svalen and Mehrn also opposed the docking of horses' tails and promoted bird protection among young people.

During Mehrn's tenure as chairperson of Svalen, Christian X, then Crown Prince of Denmark, served as the organisation's protector. Alexandra of Denmark, Queen of the United Kingdom, was also an honorary member. Mehrn was an honorary member of the Animal Defence and Anti-Vivisection Society.

== Later life and death ==
Mehrn resigned as chairperson of Svalen in 1920, a year after her husband retired from his role as treasurer, and was succeeded by August Dedenroth Berg. Despite stepping down, she continued humane work for animals well into old age.

After her husband's death in 1923, Mehrn lived with her two daughters. She died in Copenhagen on 13 December 1960, aged 98.
