= Animal welfare and rights in the Netherlands =

Treatment of and laws concerning non-human animals in the Netherlands

Animal welfare and rights in the Netherlands is about the treatment of and laws concerning non-human animals in the Netherlands. The Netherlands has moderately strong animal protections by international standards.

== History ==
The Netherlands' first national legislation related to animal welfare came in the 1886 Criminal Code, which made maltreatment of non-human animals a crime. Because the maltreatment of animals was regarded as an offense against public morality, public cruelty towards animals was penalized more heavily. The Supreme Court later interpreted "maltreatment" as "deliberately cruel treatment", which significantly reduced the ability to prosecute animal cruelty (for instance, a street vendor who killed cats by smashing them against the street was acquitted on the grounds that he intended to get their skins and therefore was not deliberately treating them with cruelty). The interpretation of "maltreatment" was broadened again in 1920.

The next major piece of Dutch legislation on animal welfare was the 1961 Animal Protection Act, followed by the 1977 Experiments on Animals Act. In 1981, the Dutch Parliament approved a declaration which included the statement that animals have intrinsic value to be protected for its own sake rather than the benefit of humans, though it is unclear what the implications of this declaration are in practice.

As a member of the European Union (EU), beginning in the 1990s Netherlands began to implement EU regulations on animal welfare, including a 1997 measure forbidding pen confinement of veal calves greater than 8 weeks old, a 1998 directive on the Five Freedoms for farmed animals, and bans on testing cosmetics on animals, barren battery cages, and gestation crates.

== Legislation ==
The Animals Act 2011 prohibits causing an animal pain or injury or damaging its health and welfare without reasonable purpose or in excess of what is reasonable for such purpose. This protection applies to domestic animals, and it is not clear whether it extends to wild animals in the wild or in captivity. The Act also requires citizens to give due care to "helpless" animals, and sets out a duty of care based on the Five Freedoms principles.

The Animals Act 2011 anti-cruelty and duty of care provisions apply to farmed animals. Additional legislation implementing European Union (EU) animal welfare regulations is also in place.

The major legislation on animals used in experiments is found in the Experiments on Animals Act 1977, which has been amended to incorporate EU requirements on research animal welfare. Researchers are required to reduce and refine scientific research on animals and prohibited from using animals where expert opinion shows that the objective can be achieved by non-animal research. Testing cosmetics on animals is prohibited as per EU animal welfare rules, as is the use of great apes in experiments

In 2014 and again in 2020, the Netherlands received a B out of possible grades A, B, C, D, E, F, G on World Animal Protection's Animal Protection Index.

== Animal issues ==
=== Animals used for food ===
==== Animal agriculture ====
Statistics on the number of animals raised and/or killed for food each year in the Netherlands include:

- 1.958 million bovine animals slaughtered (2014)
- 14.596 million pigs slaughtered (2014)
- 565,000 sheep slaughtered (2014)
- 124,000 goats slaughtered (2014)
- 324,000 tons of wild-caught marine animals (2013)
- 46,000 tons of aquaculture marine animals (2012)
- 31 million layer hens in flock (2008)
- 44.1 million broiler chickens in flock (2008)

==== Vegetarianism and veganism ====
In 2006, an estimated 4% of Dutch identified as vegetarian. Veganism appears to be uncommon: the Nederlandse Vereniging voor Veganisme (NVV, "Dutch Association for Veganism") estimated in 1996 that around 0.1% of the Dutch population were vegan. In July 2020 the NVV estimated the number of vegans in the Netherlands at 150,000. That is approximately 0.9% of the Dutch population.

=== Animals used for research ===
According to official statistics, 403,370 research procedures were carried out on animals in 2016 (not including invertebrates), a 16% fall from 2015, and down almost 40% from 2000. Mice, rats, birds, and fish accounted for over 90% of animals used. On a scale of severity, 69% of procedures were classified as mild, 22% as moderate, 3.3% as severe, and 6% as non-recovery (i.e. the animal is killed while under anesthesia).

=== Animals used for clothing ===
The Netherlands outlawed the breeding of foxes and chinchillas for their fur in 2008, and in 2012 passed a measure phasing out mink fur farming by 2024. On 11 November 2020, the Netherlands moved the phase-out of fur farming forward, putting 1 January 2021 as the target date to limit the risk of mutation of SARS-CoV-2.

Around 2015, roughly 6 million mink were killed each year for fur. In 2015, animal rights organization Stichting Animal rights released undercover footage of mink farm employees violently throwing animals.

== Animal activism ==
The Dutch organization Animal Rights was founded in 2009. Their activities include opposing fur farming, hunting, factory farming, animal testing, and advocating plant-based eating.

=== Party for the Animals ===
The Party for the Animals (PvdD) is a Dutch political party whose goals include advancing non-human animal rights and welfare. In 2006, the party won two seats in Dutch parliament, becoming the first party of its kind of be elected to a national legislature. Its successes include more stringent animal transportation regulations and securing 8 million USD to fund research into cellular agriculture. In 2014, a PvdD member was elected to the European Parliament. The PvdD has inspired the formation of a number of animal-focused parties in other countries.

== See also ==
- The Danish Animal Protection Act
- Animal consciousness
- Speciesism
- Timeline of animal welfare and rights
- Timeline of animal welfare and rights in Europe
- Ongehoord
