= Foulum =

Village in Denmark

Coordinates: 56°29′50″N 9°35′0″E

Foulum is a small Danish village with around 100 households (the settlement Formyre also included) in the Tjele parish located in Central Jutland eight kilometres east of Viborg. Foulum is a part of Region Midtjylland and a part of the Viborg municipality. Despite the small size of the village, three major centres for science and innovation are localized in Foulum: DCA - Danish Centre for Food and Agriculture, Agro Business Park and commencing 2017, the Apple Data Centre.

The thief Niels Heidenreich, who stole the Golden Horns of Gallehus, was born in Foulum in 1761. Animal rights activist Malvina Mehrn was born in Foulum in 1862. Foulum is also mentioned in a novel by the author Steen Steensen Blicher under the fictitious name Føulum.

== Centres for science and innovation in Foulum ==
- DCA - Danish Centre for Food and Agriculture (also called AU Foulum): A research centre founded in 1984. It has 700 employees. The centre has been a part of Aarhus University since 2007. The facility was created after an ideacompetition which was won by the architects Rune Fink Isaksen, Knud Blach Petersen and Hans Schwarz Sørensen.
- Agro Business Park: A business and science park for knowledge based innovation and entrepreneurship within agriculture, bioenergy, environmental technologies and food processing.
- Apple Data Centre: On February 23, 2015 the IT company Apple announced its plans to build a data centre in Foulum. The first part will begin operation in 2017, and it will be expanded until 2026. The construction of the centre will cost €840 mill. and will measure 166,000 square metres. The presence of Denmark's biggest transformer station has been an important argument for the localization of the Data Centre in Foulum. Through the station the centre will be supplied with huge amounts of green energy from hydropower plants in Norway.
- Google Data Centre: Also the IT company Google announced plans to build a data centre in Foulum. The construction will measure 131 hectare (324 acres).
