= John Laughlin =

John Laughlin may refer to:

- John Laughlin (Canadian politician) (1879–1941), Canadian politician
- John Laughlin (actor) (born 1953), American actor
- John Laughlin (New York politician) (1856–1905), New York politician
- Clarence John Laughlin (1905–1985), American photographer

== See also ==
- John Laughlin McIsaac
- John Loughlin (disambiguation)
- John McLaughlin (disambiguation)
