= John McLoughlin (disambiguation) =

John McLoughlin (1784–1857) was a Canadian fur trader and Oregon pioneer.

John McLoughlin may also refer to:

- John McLoughlin (Proctor), a 1953 bronze sculpture of John McLoughlin by Alexander Phimister Proctor
- John McLoughlin (police officer) (born c. 1953), 9/11 attacks survivor
- John McLoughlin Jr. (1812–1842), Metis Chief Trader employed by the Hudson's Bay Company
- John McLaughlin (performance artist) (1956–1990), New York City performance artist, singer, and parodist, known as John Sex

== See also ==
- John McLoughlin Bridge (built in 1933) in Oregon, US
- John McLoughlin House (built in 1845) in Oregon, US
- John McLaughlin (disambiguation)
- John MacLoughlin (1871–1943), Irish politician
- John MacLaughlin (disambiguation)
- John Loughlin (disambiguation)
