= Paul Goldstein (law professor) =

American law professor (born 1943)

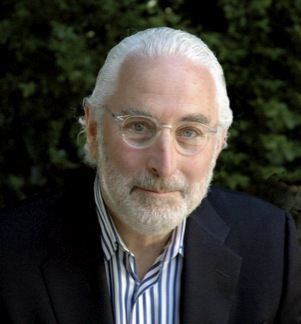
- Born: January 14, 1943 (age 83); Mount Vernon, New York, U.S.
- Education: Brandeis University; Columbia University
- Occupations: professor, author, lawyer
- Employer: Stanford University
- Website: http://paulgoldstein.net/

Paul Goldstein (born January 14, 1943) is a law professor at Stanford Law School.

Goldstein is the author of an influential five-volume treatise on U.S. copyright law and a one-volume treatise on international copyright law, as well as casebooks on intellectual property and international intellectual property. He has authored nine books including five novels, Errors and Omissions, A Patent Lie, Secret Justice, Legal Asylum and Havana Requiem, which won the 2013 Harper Lee Prize for Legal Fiction. Some of his other works include Copyright’s Highway: From the Printing Press to the Cloud, a widely acclaimed book on the history and future of copyright, and Intellectual Property: The Tough New Realities That Could Make or Break Your Business.

Goldstein has served as chairman of the United States Office of Technology Assessment Advisory Panel on Intellectual Property Rights in an Age of Electronics and Information, has been a visiting scholar at the Max Planck Institute for Foreign and International Patent, Copyright, and Competition Law, and was a founding faculty member of the Munich Intellectual Property Law Center. In addition, before joining the Stanford Law School faculty in 1975, he was a professor of law at the University at Buffalo Law School.

== Recent publications ==
- Paul Goldstein, Goldstein On Copyright, 3rd ed., New York: Aspen, 2024.
- Paul Goldstein and P. Bernt Hugenholtz, International Copyright: Principles, Law and Practice 4th ed., New York: Oxford University Press, 2019.
- Paul Goldstein and Marketa Trimble, International Intellectual Property Law: Cases and Materials, 3rd edition, New York: Foundation Press, 2012.
- Paul Goldstein and R. Anthony Reese, Copyright, Patent, Trademark and Related State Doctrines: Cases and Materials on Intellectual Property Law, 7th edition, New York, NY: Foundation Press, 2012.
- Paul Goldstein, Copyright's Highway: From the Printing Press to the Cloud, 2d. ed., Stanford, CA: Stanford University Press, 2019.
