= Willy Hartner =

German scientist and polymath

Willy Hartner (22 January 1905 – 16 May 1981) was a German scientist and polymath. He studied at Goethe University, Frankfurt am Main, where he obtained his PhD in physics in 1928 and where he later served as professor from 1940, as ordinary professor [German academic terminology] from 1946.

In 1943, he founded the Institute for the History of Natural Sciences, today part of the Institute of Physics at the university. Hartner received the George Sarton Medal in 1971. He was president of the Académie Internationale d'Histoire des Sciences from 1971 to 1978. He was a fellow of the Royal Astronomical Society from 1935, of the Academia Real de buenas letras, Spain, in 1968 and of the Accademia Nazionale dei Lincei, Italy, in 1975, and of the Royal Danish Academy in 1980. In 1975, he received the rank of knight in the Légion d'honneur.

== Bibliography ==
- 1928, Die Störungen der Planeten in Gyldénschen Koordinaten als Funktionen der mittleren Länge "perturbation of the planets in Gyldén coordinates as a function of mean longitude", Dissertation
- 1955, Le Problème de la planète Kaïd
- 1960, Klassizismus und Kulturverfall
- 1961, Freiheit in der Erziehung - Erziehung in der Freiheit, Winklers Verlag, Darmstadt
- 1961, Judentum und Abendland
- 1962, Die Stellung der Universität zu den politischen und gesellschaftlichen Problemen unserer Zeit, Klostermann, Frankfurt a.M.
- 1965, "The Earliest History of the Constellations in the Near East and the Motif of the Lion-Bull Combat," JNES 24, 1–2, January–April 1965, pp. 1–17.
- 1968, Oriens, occidens, G. Olms, Hildesheim
- 1969, Die Goldhörner von Gallehus "The Golden Horns of Gallehus"
