= Foulum Data Center =

Apple data center in Denmark

Coordinates: 56°29′4.63″N 9°34′4.12″E

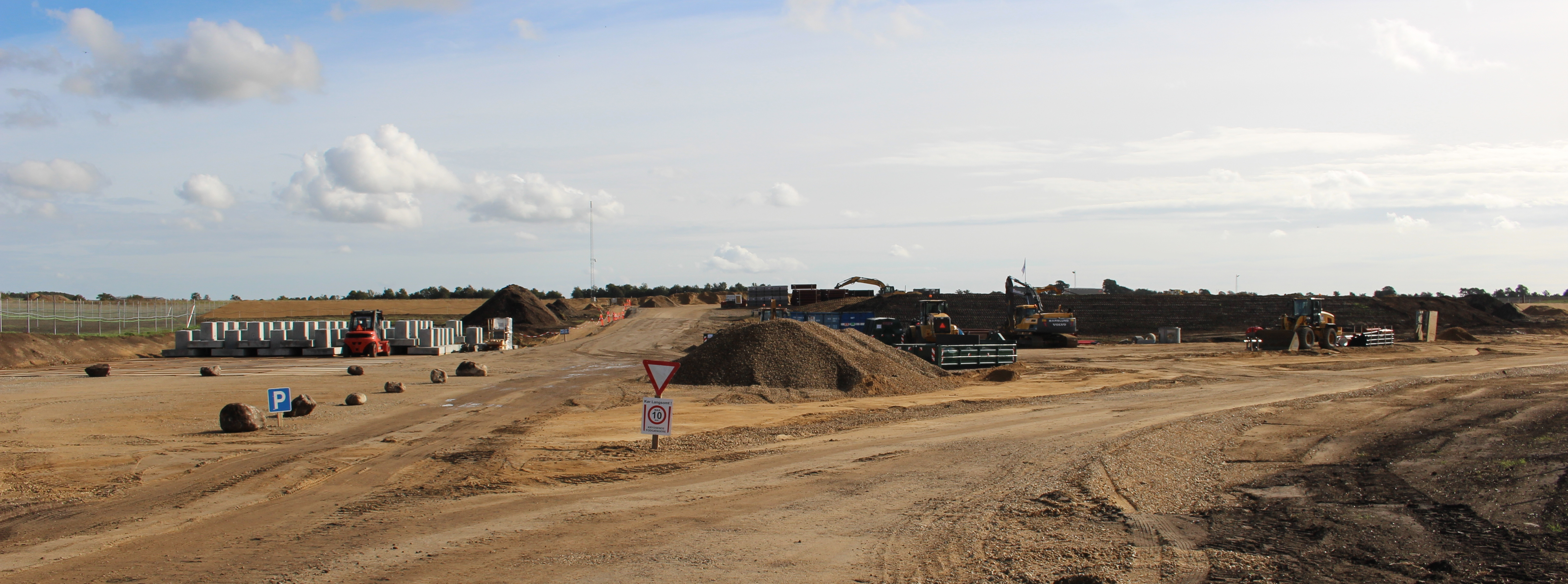
Excavation for the data center at Foulum in 2016

Foulum Data Center (name not official) is a data center operated by Apple Inc. at the village of Foulum in the Viborg Municipality, in Denmark. It opened in September 2020.

The data center was announced on February 23, 2015, along with a similar data center in Ireland, which plans were canceled in mid-2018. It will have a size of 166,000 square metres (1,790,000 sq ft) and Apple's total investment for the data center amounts to around €850 million.

Apple's Data Center will service the company's European customers in connection with its online services such as the iTunes Store, App Store, iMessage, Maps and Siri.

The data center is located adjacent to the grid hub Tjele, where a 1.5 GW high voltage direct current line connects to hydropower in Norway. The center was intended to send surplus heat to the local district heating network. It is also planned that the center will only use renewable energy and will be able to use hydroelectricity from Norway. Apple's needs in 2017 were scheduled to be 7 megawatts for the start in 2019. Apple owns a 42 MW solar farm near Thisted, and erects two 8.4 MW wind turbines on the west coast.

The choice of Denmark instead of Norway was estimated to be due to a low Danish energy tax of just 0.5 øre per kWh compared to 12.39 øre per kWh in Norway. It is estimated that the data center consumes 700 GWh annually. As part of the project, an emergency power plant is built for use in backups of any power outages. The emergency power plant will consist of 14 units, each with an approximately 7 metres (23 ft) high diesel generator, an earthy tank unit with room for approximately 25,000 litres (5,500 imp gal; 6,600 US gal) of diesel oil and an approximately 16 metres (52 ft) high chimney.

When the data center was announced on February 23, 2015, it was received with great optimism from Viborg Municipality, and it was argued that this was the largest foreign capital investment in Denmark ever. The municipality expected that the construction phase would "create many hundred jobs", and that the operating phase would also create a lot of jobs - directly as well as derived. The construction of the first craft houses was started in November 2015.

Denmark, for over three years, secretly negotiated with Apple. In addition to the municipality, the negotiations also included Aarhus University, Energi Viborg and the Department of Foreign Affairs 'Invest in Denmark'. The then Minister of Trade and Development Mogens Jensen found that advertising had to be "the best business news of the year for Denmark". A similar Apple data center in Maiden, North Carolina created 50 full-time jobs.

Through public access, Dagbladet Børsen found that tax agency SKAT was also involved in the negotiations, where a tax-technical model was constructed, so that the cooling in Apple's data center was considered heat-producing unit. The unusual construction led to several questions in the Energy, Supply and Climate Committee in the Danish Parliament.

In July 2017, another Danish Apple data center was announced. It was planned to be located at the transformer station Kassø in Aabenraa Municipality, however its plans were canceled in mid-2019 in favour of expanding the Foulum datacenter instead.
