= Hlewagast =

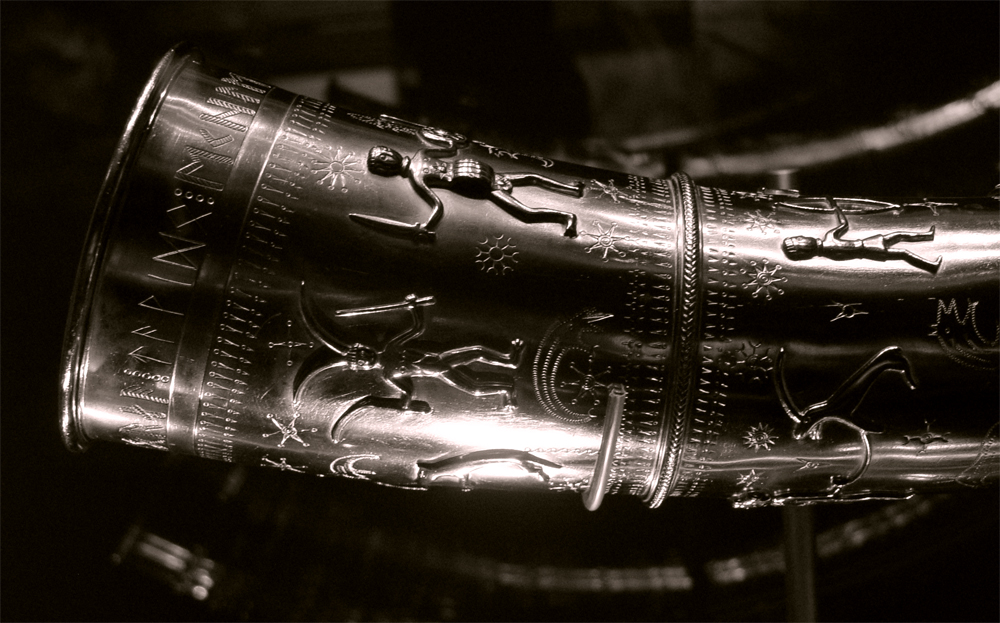
Hlewagast's inscription

Hlewagast, the son of Holt, was a maker of drinking horns whose name is preserved for posterity because of the runic inscription identifying him, an inscription on a horn made ca. 400. The inscription reads, "ek hlewagastiR holtijaR horna tawido"; "I, Hlewagastir Holtson ("Holt's son"), made this horn".

The horn, made out of gold, is one of the two Golden Horns of Gallehus; the one Hlewagast signed was found in 1734. Both were stolen in 1802 and melted, but both horns were reconstructed on the basis of earlier drawings.
