= John McLachlan =

John McLachlan may refer to:

- John McLachlan (architect) (1843–1893), Scottish architect
- John McLachlan (bishop) (1826–1893), Scottish Roman Catholic clergyman
- John McLachlan (composer) (born 1964), Irish composer
- John McLachlan (politician) (1840–1915), New Zealand Member of Parliament
- John MacKean McLachlan (1873-1930), British socialist politician
- Dr John MacLachlan (1804-1874), Scottish Gaelic poet

== See also ==
- Jon McLachlan, New Zealand rugby player
