= John McLaughlin (footballer, born 1948) =

Scottish footballer

Personal information
- Full name: John Ian McLaughlin
- Date of birth: 3 January 1948 (age 78)
- Place of birth: Stirling, Scotland
- Position: Left back

Youth career
- –: Gowanhill United

Senior career*
Years	Team	Apps	(Gls)
1967–1971	Falkirk	106	(10)
1971–1976	Everton	61	(1)
1976	Seattle Sounders	19	(0)
1976–1977	Falkirk	31	(2)
Total		217	(13)
- * Club domestic league appearances and goals

John Ian McLaughlin (born 3 January 1948) is a Scottish former professional footballer who played as a left back. Active in Scotland, England and the United States between 1967 and 1977, McLaughlin made 217 career League appearances for three clubs, scoring 13 goals.

== Career ==
Born in Stirling, McLaughlin played junior football with Gowanhill United. He turned professional in 1967 with Falkirk of the Scottish Football League, spending four seasons with the club before moving to Everton of the English Football League. After five seasons with Everton, McLaughlin spent a season in the North American Soccer League with the Seattle Sounders, before returning to first club Falkirk for a final season.
