= Golden Horns of Gallehus =

Archaeological artefacts

Coordinates: 55°42′36″N 9°32′00″E

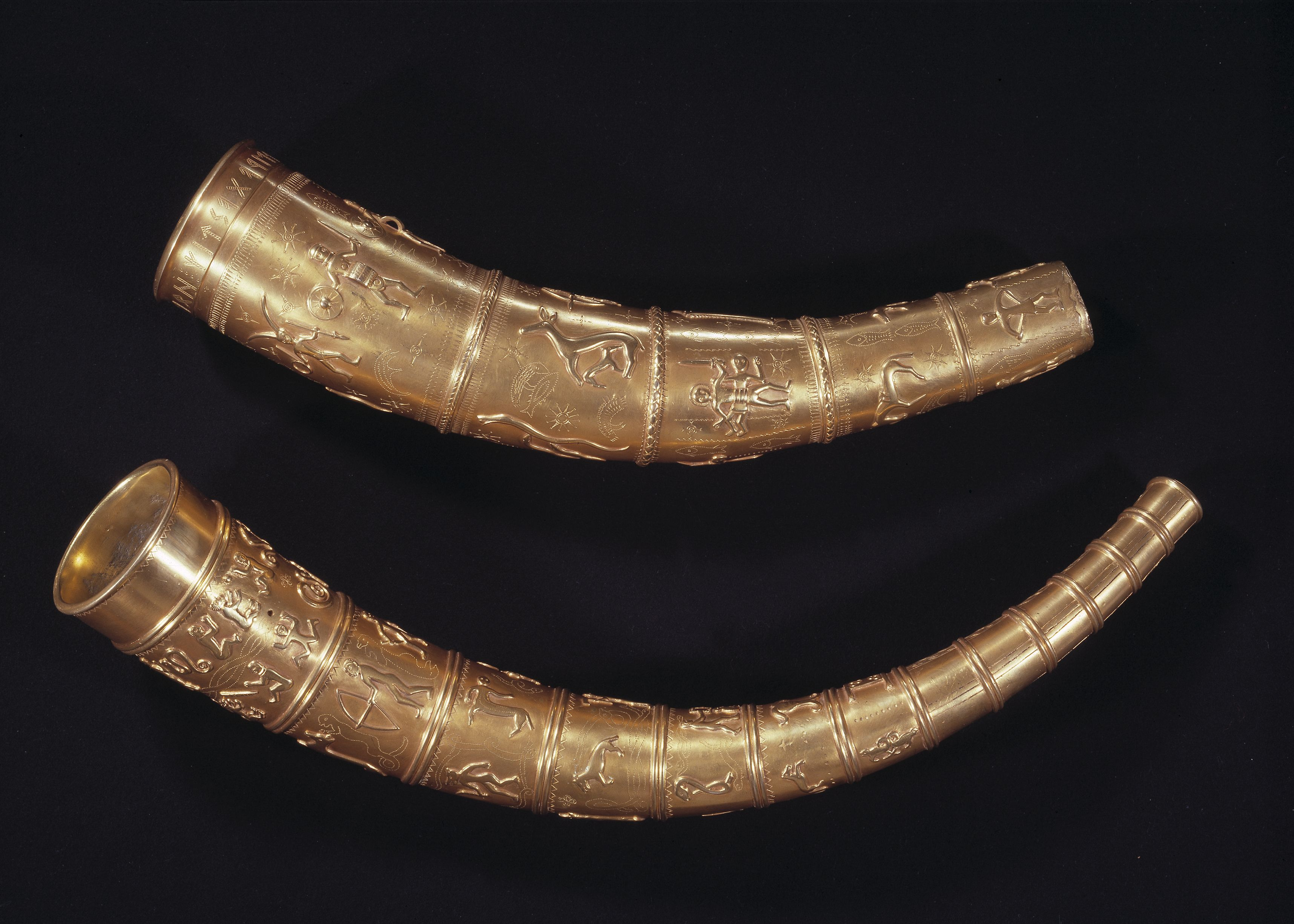
The replicas of the Golden Horns of Gallehus exhibited at the National Museum of Denmark

The Golden Horns of Gallehus were two horns made of sheet gold, discovered in Gallehus, north of Møgeltønder in Southern Jutland, Denmark. The horns dated to the early 5th century, i.e. the beginning of the Germanic Iron Age.

The horns were found in 1639 and in 1734, respectively, at locations only some 15–20 metres apart. They were composed of segments of double sheet gold. The two horns were found incomplete; the longer one found in 1639 had seven segments with ornaments, to which six plain segments and a plain rim were added, possibly by the 17th-century restorer. The shorter horn found in 1734 had six segments, a narrow one bearing a Proto-Norse Elder Futhark inscription at the rim and five ornamented with images. It is uncertain whether the horns were intended as drinking horns, or as blowing horns, although drinking horns have more pronounced history as luxury items made from precious metal.

The original horns were stolen and melted down in 1802. Casts made of the horns in the late 18th century were also lost. Replicas of the horns must thus rely on 17th and 18th-century drawings exclusively and are accordingly fraught with uncertainty. Nevertheless, replicas of the original horns were produced, two of them exhibited at the National Museum of Denmark, Copenhagen, with copies at e.g. the Moesgaard Museum, near Aarhus, Denmark. These replicas also have a history of having been stolen and retrieved twice, in 1993 and in 2007.

The horns are the subject of one of the best-known poems in Danish literature, "The Golden Horns" (Guldhornene), by Adam Oehlenschläger.

== Description ==
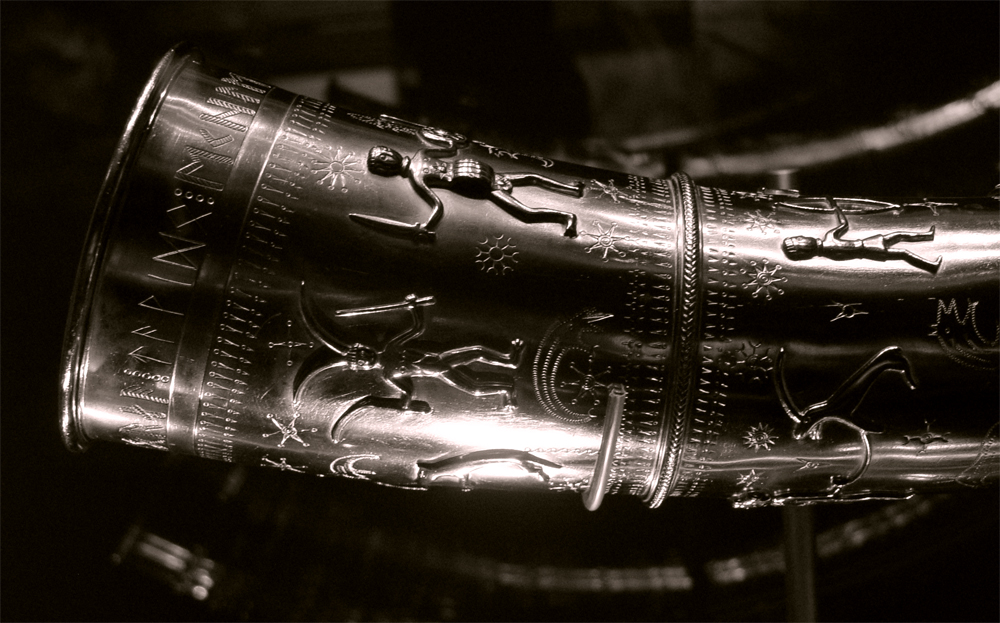
Detail of the runic inscriptions found on one of the copies housed at the Moesgaard Museum.

Both the original horns consisted of two thick layers of gold sheet, the inner sheet had a smooth surface and consisted of 12 karat gold, amalgamated with silver, the outer sheet consisted of pure 24 karat gold. The outer sheet was constructed from a number of rings, each covered with cast figures soldered onto the rings, with yet more figures chased into the rings between the larger figures. The second horn bore an Elder Futhark inscription in Proto-Norse which is of great value for Germanic linguistics.

The longer horn in its restored state was 75.8 cm in length, as measured along the outer perimeter; the opening diameter was 10.4 cm., and the horn weighed 3.2 kg. The shorter horn was 50 cm in length, but was more massive and weighed 3.7 kg.

Because the casts made of the horns were lost, it is uncertain whether the horns were simply curved or whether they had a winding, helix-like curvature like a natural ox-horn.

=== Runic inscription ===
Inscription reading
A reading of the second horn's inscription in Proto-Norse.

The second horn bore the following Elder Futhark inscription (DR 12 †U), identifying the maker as Hlewagast:

ᛖᚲ ᚺᛚᛖᚹᚨᚷᚨᛊᛏᛁᛉ ᛬ ᚺᛟᛚᛏᛁᛃᚨᛉ ᛬ ᚺᛟᚱᚾᚨ ᛬ ᛏᚨᚹᛁᛞᛟ ᛬
ek hlewagastiz : holtijaz : horna : tawido :
ek Hlewagastiz {} Holtijaz {} horna {} tawidō {}
I Hlewagastiz {} Holtijaz {} horn {} made {}
"I Hlewagastiz Holtijaz made the horn."

This inscription is among the earliest inscriptions in the Elder Futhark that record a full sentence, and the earliest preserving a line of alliterative verse.

The meaning of the given name Hlewagastiz is debated: it may mean either "lee guest" or "fame guest". Holtijaz may either be a patronymic, "son (or descendant) of Holt", or express a characteristic such as "of the wood".

=== Possible cipher runes ===
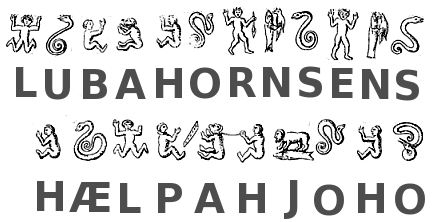
A reading of the supposed cipher in the top segment according to Hartner (1969).

The two rows of images in the top segment of the longer horn have been taken as a cipher encoding a runic text of 22 letters, although there is no universally accepted decipherment. Hartner (1969) read luba horns ens helpa hjoho, an "apotropaic sentence" translated by Hartner as "may I, the potion of this horn, bring help to the clan".

=== Iconography ===
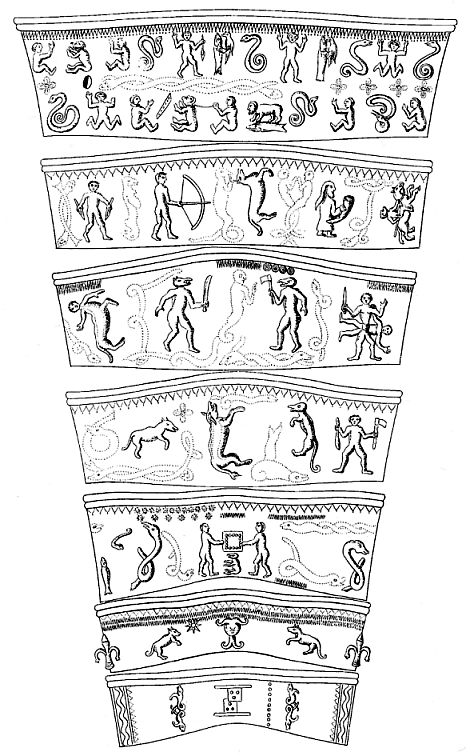
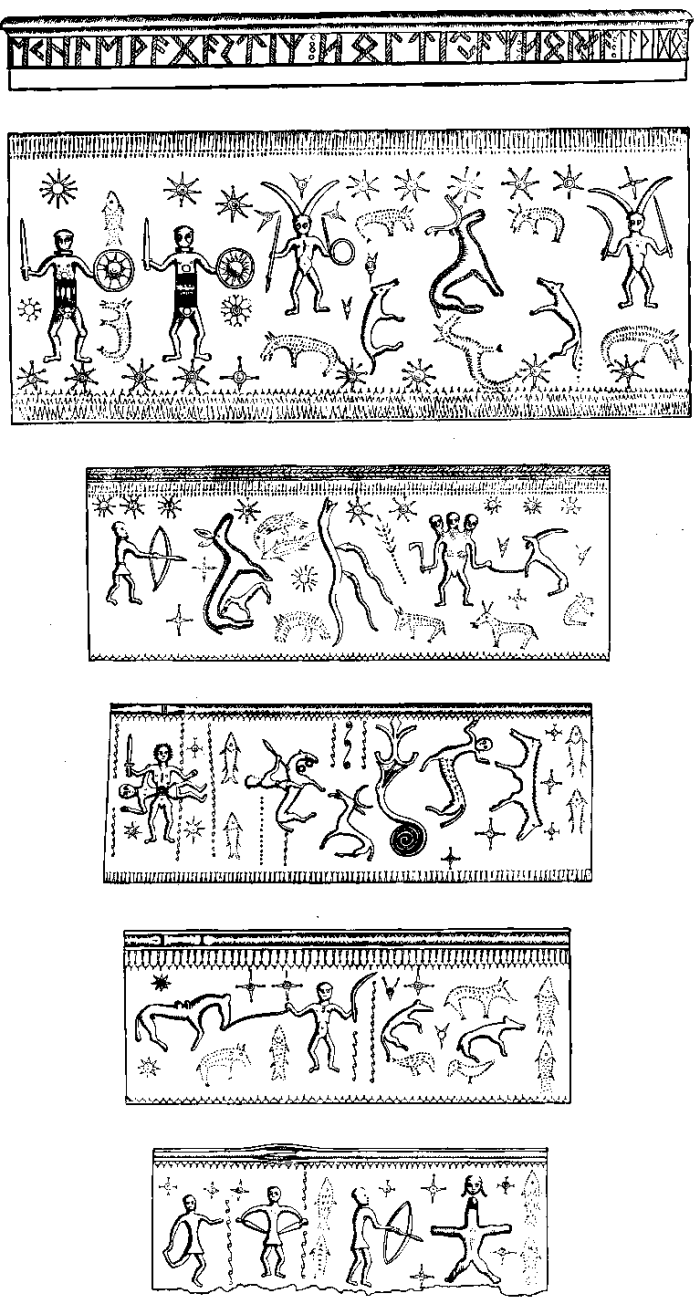
The image panels of the both horns projected onto a flat surface (etchings by J. R. Paulli, 1734)

The figures embossed on the horns combine depictions of numerous anthropomorphic, zoomorphic and hybrid motifs. In addition to the main figures which are soldered to the horn, protruding from the horn surface, there are a number of additional figures and ornaments realized by chasing.

There have been numerous attempts at their interpretation, all speculative. Interpretation is especially difficult since it has to rely on the imprecise drawings made before the loss of the original horns. Interpretations usually try to align the iconography with Germanic mythology, although Mediterranean (Byzantine) elements are also cited.

Obvious parallels with Germanic Migration Period art are rather limited. There are large considerable number of serpents, some of them intertwining in the fashion of the wider animal style of Dark Age Europe. A figure holding a horn may be compared to the "valkyrie" shown on the Tjängvide image stone. Two masked figures armed with sword and shield on the smaller horn are reminiscent of other Germanic depictions of sword-dances, e.g. on the Sutton Hoo helmet. Two other armed figures with large horns or antlers may be compared to horned helmet iconography, or to the "Cernunnos" figure on the Gundestrup cauldron. The peculiar image of a tricephalous (three-headed) figure has been taken as a pagan predecessor of depictions of a tricephalous Christ symbolizing the Trinity in Christian iconography but is difficult to place in a contemporary context. Olrik (1918) nevertheless recognized a number of Norse gods among the figures, including Tyr, Odin, Thor and Freyr.

Frankfurt historian of science Willy Hartner in 1969 published an interpretation involving gematria and archaeoastronomy, taking many of the figures as representing constellations, claiming that the iconography refers to a lunar eclipse of 4 November 412 and a solar eclipse of 16 April 413.

The first horn (A) had figures arranged in seven segments, The second horn (B) had six segments including the narrow one containing the runic inscription around the rim.

horn	segment	in relief	in chasing
A	1	two rows of anthropomorphic and theriomorphic figures, including snakes and fish (Hartner's cipher runes)	Two intertwining snakes and five four-pointed stars
A	2	Five figures, four anthropomorphic, including one on horseback, one armed with a bow, one holding a drinking horn, besides a horse without a rider.	five mythological hybrid figures,
A	3	an armed figure standing behind a prostrate body (similar to the arrangement on the 4th segment of the second horn), a centaur, and two figures with dogs' heads.	intertwining snake figures, one with a human torso
A	4	another armed figure and three animals.	five snakes, one four-pointed star
A	5	two figures playing a board game, with a creature sitting beneath the board, two snakes, and a fish.	four snakes and a number of small stars
A	6	five images in a row, two of them dogs (of which one is facing a sun or star), the others possibly plants.	
A	7	three symbols of unclear significance, two plant-like and one like two boards or flags with triple dots or holes	a vertical dotted line, and an arrangement of vertical wavy and zig-zag lines
B	1		the Elder Futhark inscription
B	2	four anthropomorphic figures, all of them armed, two of them with large horns or antlers. Between and below these are a number of theriomorphic figures, one of them with antlers. the two "sword-dancers" had an opening probably intended for a chain for carrying the horn	Scattered among the figures are star symbols with three to eight points and a number of animals, including a fish
B	3	two anthropomorphic figures, one armed with a bow aiming at an animal figure, and one with three heads holding an axe in one hand, and a rope attached to an antlered or horned animal, perhaps a goat. Three snakes, a large one holding a ball in its mouth and two smaller ones biting the belly of the larger one. Lincoln (1976) takes the tricephalous figure, the tethered horned animal, and the three snakes "lying dead" as a Germanic reflex of the Indo-European dragon-slaying and cattle-raiding myth.	other theriomorphic figures and star symbols.
B	4	a rider on horseback, another figure holding a sword standing in front of a prostrate body, and a centaur. A horse-like animal with a head on each end and no tail. A curling snake facing or devouring a plant-like item which may represent the wyrm (dragon) Níðhöggr devouring the roots of Yggdrasill	fish shapes and star symbols.
B	5	a figure holding a large sickle or sword in the left hand, and holding a horse on a tether in the right hand. Two dogs.	boar, bird and fish figures
B	6	four anthropomorphic figures, one armed with a bow, one with two daggers, one holding its right foot in its right hand, and one apparently decapitated,	four fish figures and eight four-pointed stars.

== Discovery ==
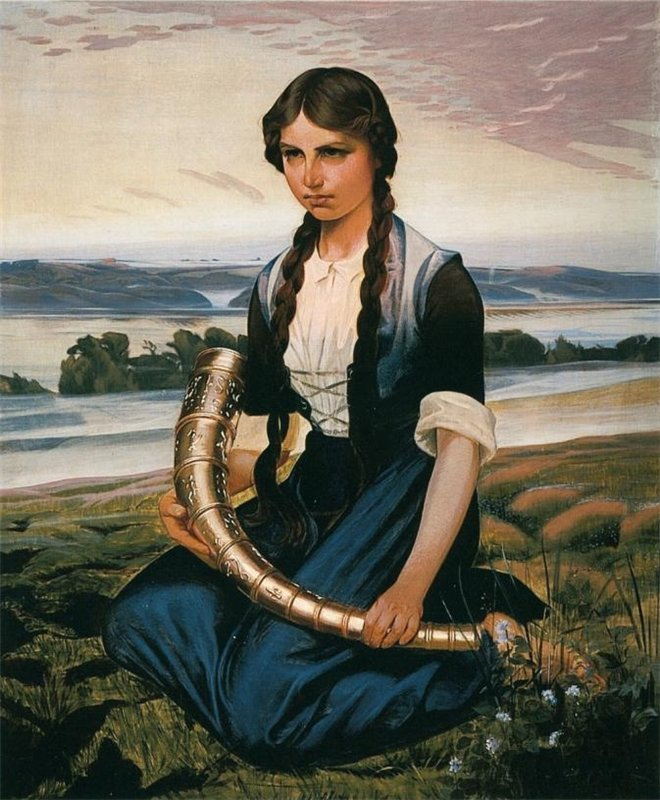
The Girl Who Finds The Gold Horn (1906) by Harald Slott-Møller.

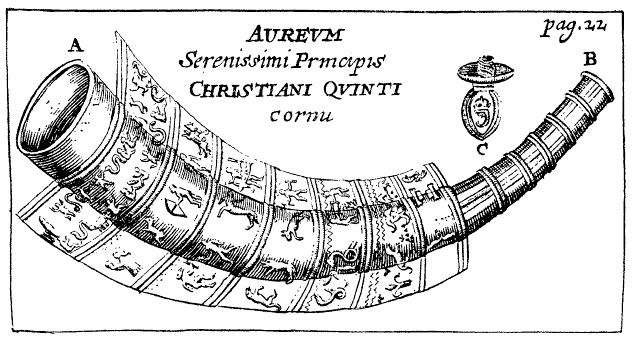
A description of the first horn was published in the Journal des Savants in 1678.

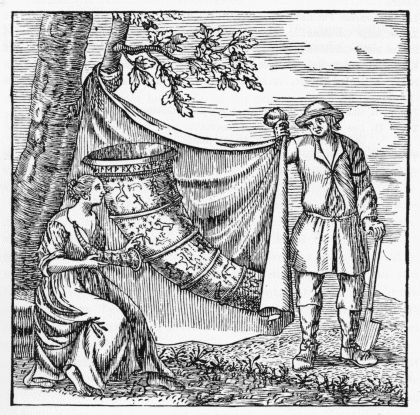
Title page illustration of the 1734 treatise on the second horn by Richard Joachim Paulli

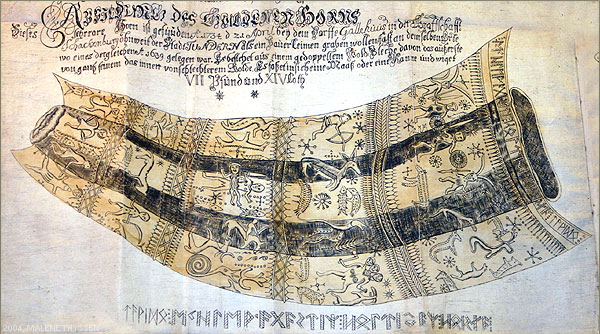
Depiction of the horn found AD 1734 on 21 April near the village of Gallehus, in Schackenborg county, not far from the town of Tønder as a peasant was digging, at nearly the same place as a similar one was found AD 1639. It is made from a double gold sheet, the outer one of very fine, the inner of inferior gold. It holds one Maß or ... and weighs 7 pounds 14 ounces

=== First horn ===
The longer horn was discovered on 20 July 1639 by a peasant girl named Kirsten Svendsdatter in the village of Gallehus, near Møgeltønder, Denmark when she saw it protrude above the ground. She wrote a letter to King Christian IV of Denmark who retrieved it and in turn gave it to the Danish prince Christian, who refurbished it into a drinking-horn, adding a golden pommel to be screwed on at the narrow end to close it up.

The Danish antiquarian Olaus Wormius wrote a treatise named De aureo cornu on the first Golden Horn in 1641. The first preserved sketch of the horn comes from this treatise. Wormius notes that he had not seen the horn in the state in which it was found, and it cannot now be determined whether the rim and the narrow segments devoid of ornamentation were modern additions like the pommel.

In 1678, the horn was described in the Journal des Savants.

=== Second horn ===
About 100 years later on 21 April 1734 the other (shorter, damaged) horn was found by Erich Lassen not far from the first horn. He gave it to the count of Schackenborg who in turn delivered it to King Christian VI of Denmark and received 200 rigsdaler in return. From this moment both horns were stored at Det kongelige Kunstkammer (The Royal Chamber of Art) at Christiansborg, currently the Danish Rigsarkivet (national archive). The shorter horn was described in a treatise by archivist Richard Joachim Paulli in the same year.

== Burglary and destruction ==
=== Original horns ===
On 4 May 1802 the horns were stolen by a goldsmith and watchmaker named Niels Heidenreich from Foulum, who entered a storage area containing the horns using forged keys. Heidenreich took the horns home and melted them down to recycle the gold. The theft was discovered the next day and a bounty of 1,000 rigsdaler was advertised in the papers.

The grandmaster of the goldsmiths' guild, Andreas Holm, suspected that Heidenreich had been involved, since he had tried to sell Holm forged "pagodas" (Indian coins with god motifs), made from bad gold mixed with brass. Holm and his colleagues had kept watch on Heidenreich and saw him dump coin stamps in the town moat. He was arrested on 27 April 1803 and confessed on 30 April. On 10 June Heidenreich was sentenced to prison, and not released until 1840. He died four years later. His buyers returned the recycled gold, which ended up in coins, not copies of the horns.

A set of plaster casts of the horns had been made for a cardinal in Rome, but they had already been lost in a shipwreck off the Corsican coast. Approximate copies were instead created from sketches. The horns pictured above are newer copies, made in 1980.

=== Copies ===
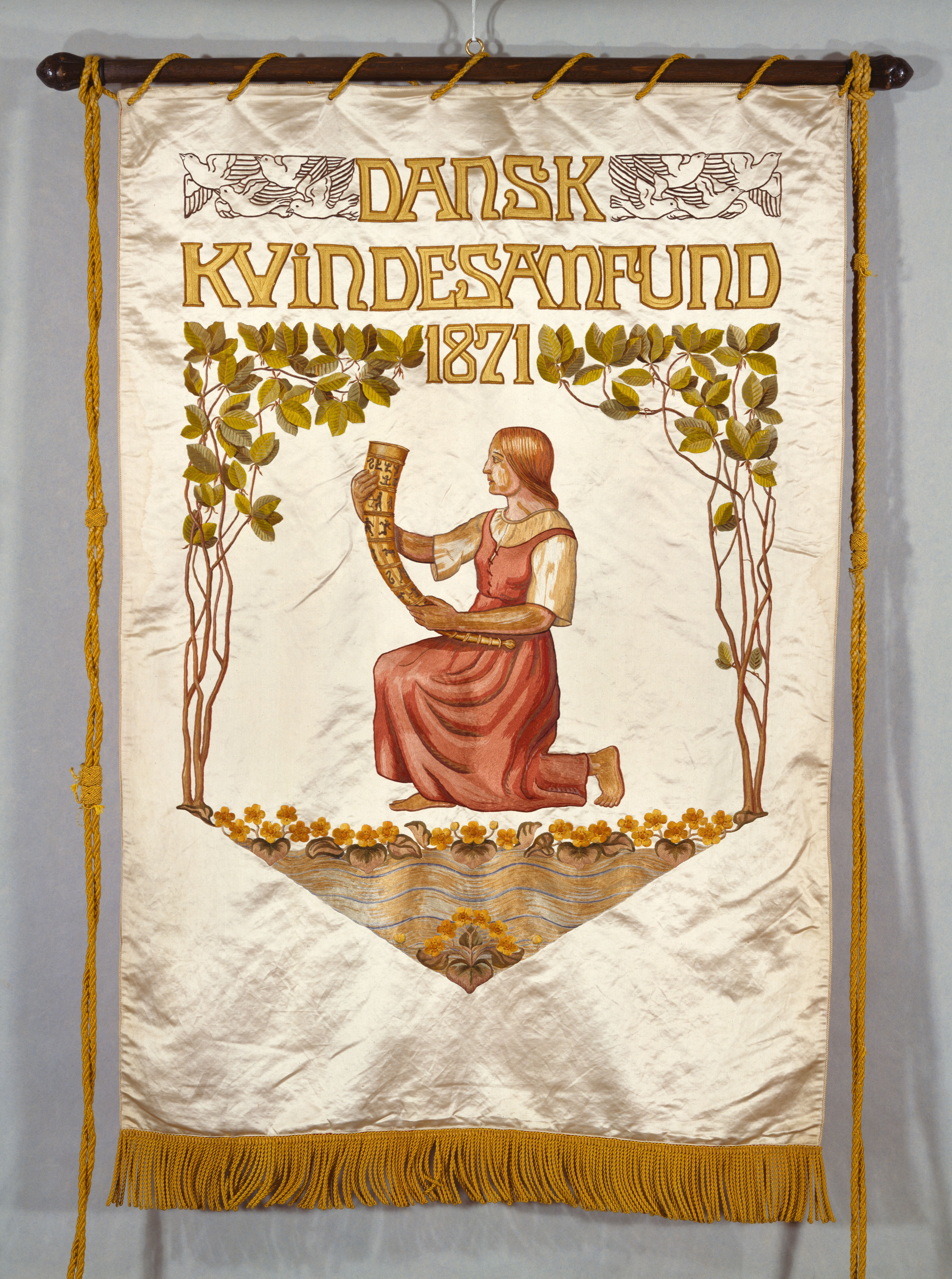
Dansk Kvindesamfund banner, 1887.

In 1993, copies of the horns were stolen from Moesgaard Museum, which were shortly after recovered ditched in a forest near Hasselager. These copies are made of gilded brass.

On 17 September 2007 a set of modern gilded silver copies were stolen from Kongernes Jelling museum at 4:30 in the morning, but were recovered shortly after on 19 September 2007.

=== Stories ===
Louise McHenry and Marlene Ahrens, two students at IT University of Copenhagen, used SCVNGR, a location-based game to develop a fictional narrative where participants played a detective and investigated the theft of the Golden Horns.

== Memorial stones in Gallehus ==
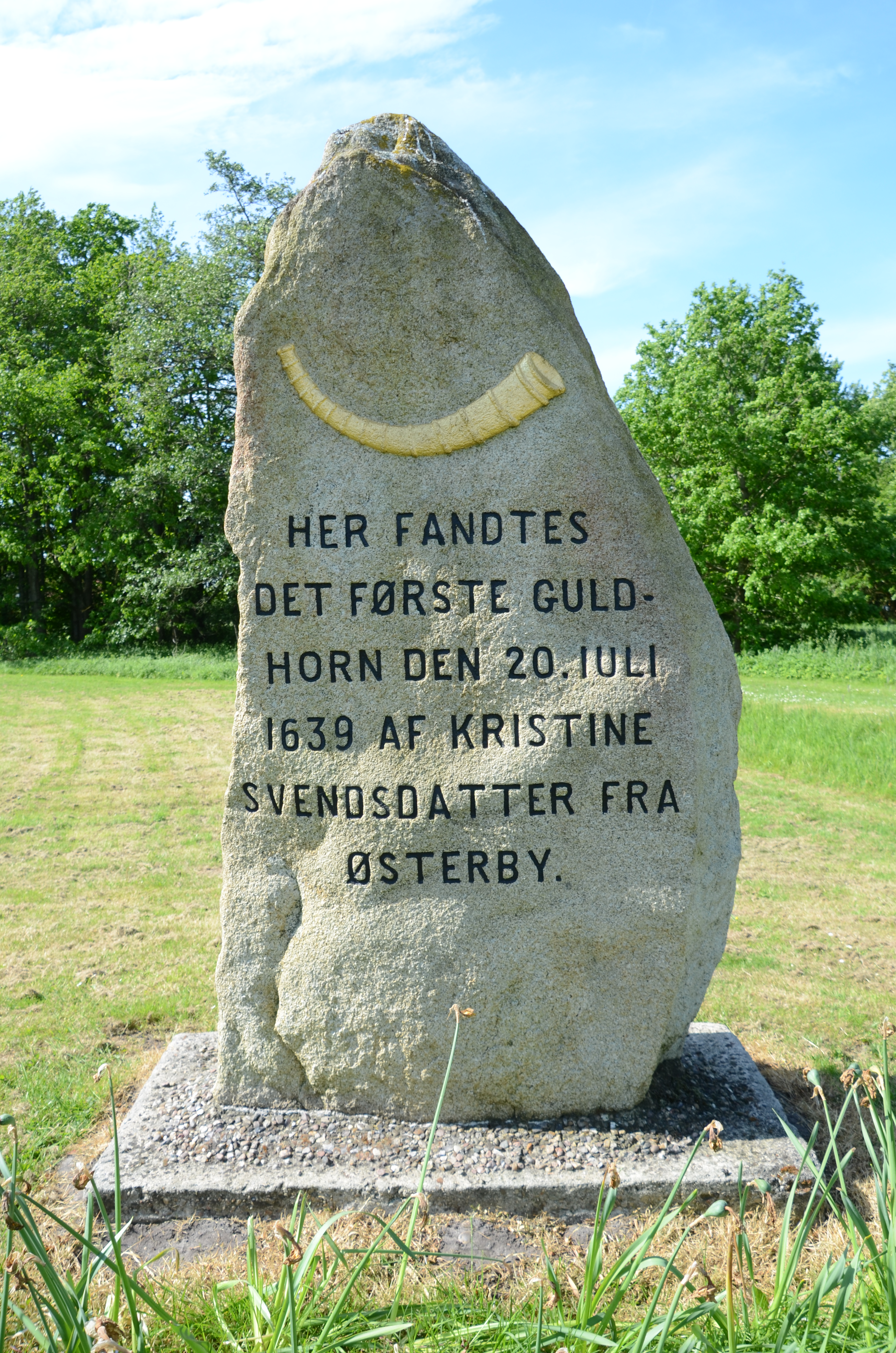

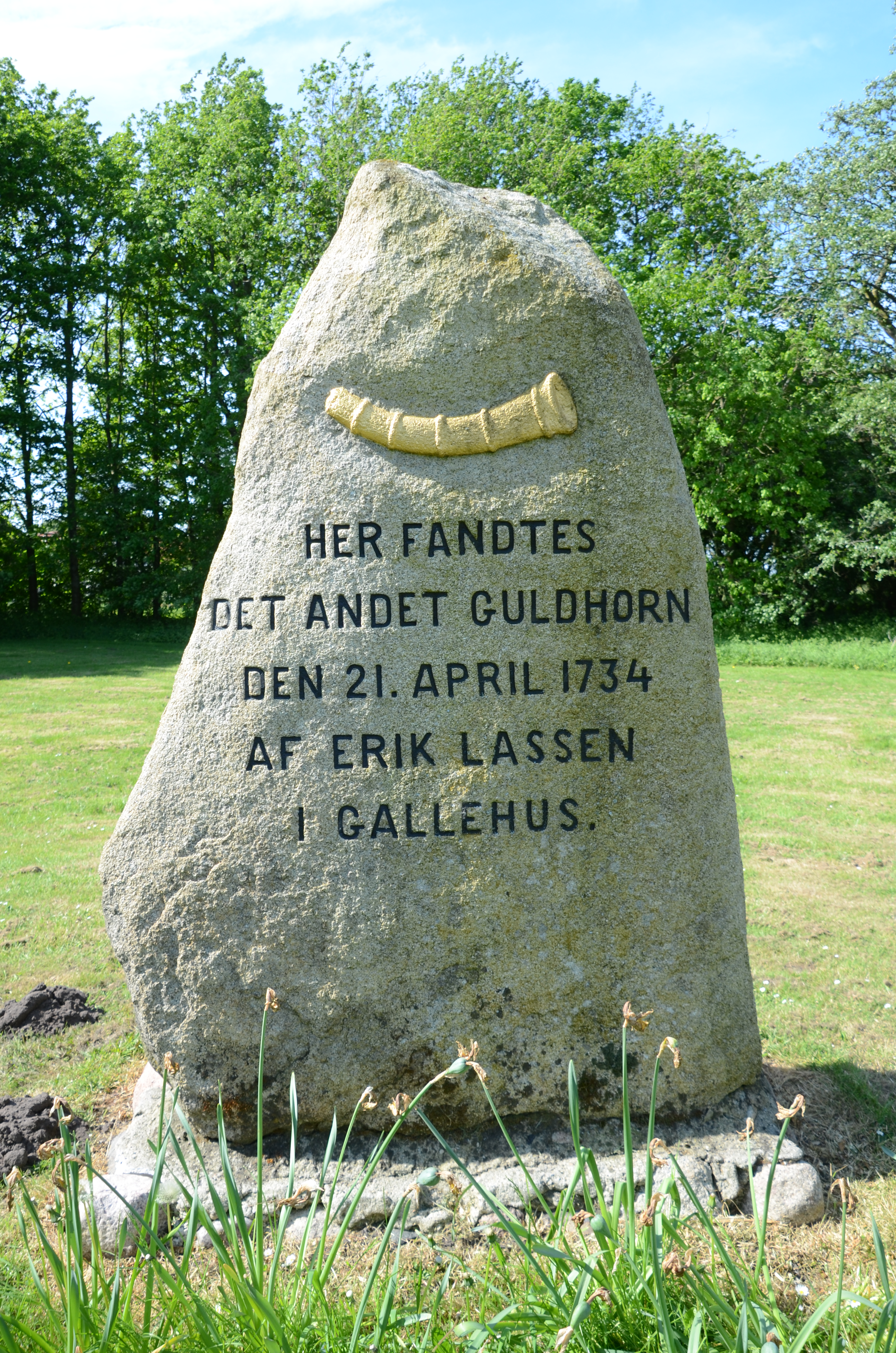

== Literature ==
- Arthur Beer: Hartner and the Riddle of the Golden Horns, Journal for the History of Astronomy, Vol. 1, p. 139 (1970).
- Ottar Grønvik: Runinskriften på gullhornet fra Gallehus. In: Maal og Minne. Det Norske Samlaget, Oslo 1999, 1, 1–18.
- Willy Hartner: Die Goldhörner von Gallehus F. Steiner, Stuttgart (1969), reprint 1998, ISBN 3-515-00078-X.
- Heinz Klingenberg: Runenschrift – Schriftdenken – Runeninschriften. Carl Winter, Heidelberg 1973. ISBN 3-533-02181-5
- H. F. Nielsen, W. Heizmann, M. Axboe: Gallehus. In: Reallexikon der germanischen Altertumskunde, ed. Heinrich Beck. Bd 10. Walter de Gruyter, Berlin-New York 1998, pp. 330 ff. ISBN 3-11-015102-2
