= Ongehoord =

Dutch animal welfare and justice research group

- Formation: 2011
- Type: Research and advocacy collective
- Headquarters: Netherlands
- Methods: Research, public education, advocacy, campaigning
- Website: https://www.ongehoord.nl/en

Ongehoord is a Dutch research and advocacy group focused on animal welfare and animal justice. The group produces and circulates research, commentary and public-facing materials on the treatment of animals in agriculture, industry, research and broader society.

The organisation's name is Dutch for "unheard of" or "not listened to", reflecting its stated concern with giving attention to animals and to the social, political and ethical questions surrounding their treatment. Ongehoord presents itself as part of a wider movement linking animal welfare with questions of justice, power and structural harm.

== Work and focus ==
Ongehoord's work centres on the relationship between humans and non-human animals, with particular attention to industrial animal agriculture, animal experimentation and the legal and political status of animals. The group argues that animal suffering should be understood not only as a welfare issue, but also as a question of justice and systemic exploitation.

In 2023, Ongehoord installed hidden cameras in five collection centers for cows and calves in the Netherlands. The footage showed handlers hitting several animals with sticks and an excessive use of stun guns. The Nederlandse Voedsel- en Warenautoriteit (NVWA, Dutch Food and Consumer Product Safety Authority) referred to the images of abused and crippled animals as "disturbing and sometimes downright shocking". Following this investigation, NVWA placed one company under increased supervision.

== Approach ==
Ongehoord combines research with public advocacy. Its activities include writing reports, sharing educational material, participating in public debate and supporting campaigns aimed at reducing animal suffering. The group has positioned itself as critical of mainstream animal welfare reform, and inspection services like NVWA, when such reform does not, in its view, challenge the deeper structures that produce harm. For example, the group has openly criticized reforms such as the Beter Leven (Better Life) product quality certifications, claiming they do not reflect the actual living conditions of the animals.

The collective's framing of animal justice emphasizes that animals are not merely objects of welfare policy, but beings with interests that ought to be recognized in legal and ethical discussions. In this sense, Ongehoord aligns with abolitionist or justice-oriented approaches within contemporary animal advocacy. The group has also stated that there is no livestock farming without animal suffering.

== See also ==
- Animal ethics
