= Hugenholtz =

Dutch-German patrician family

- family
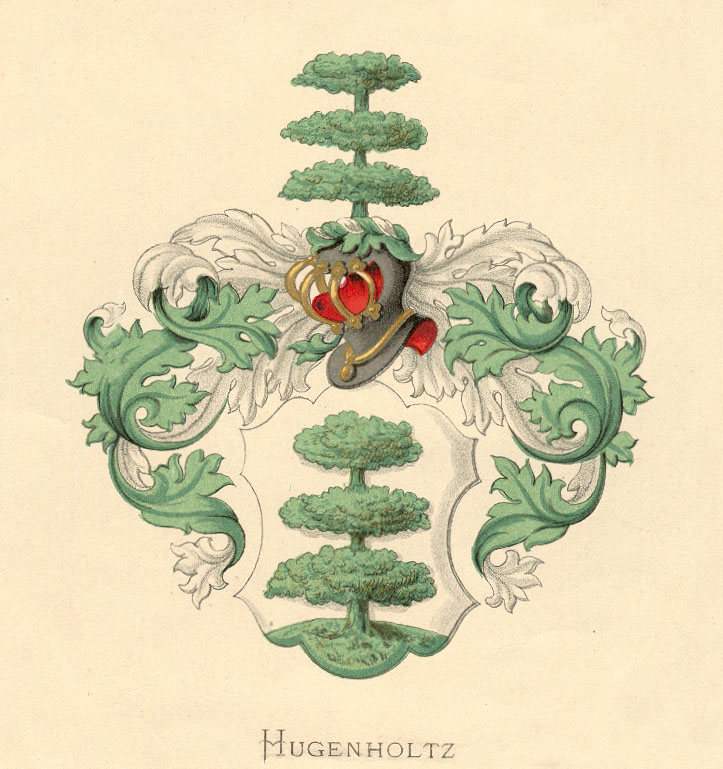
- Country: Netherlands; German
- Founded: 18th century
- Founder: Petrus Bernardus Hugenholtz

Hugenholtz is a Dutch-German patrician family.

== History ==
The family's founder was Petrus Bernardus Hugenholtz, teacher at the Latin school in Wetter (Ruhr) who died in 1736. His grandson, the reverend Petrus Hermannus Hugenholtz (1728–1766) moved to the Netherlands.

== Notable members ==
- Jan Albert Hendrik Hugenholtz (1825–1874), colonial official
- Arina Hugenholtz (1848–1934), painter
- Willem Hugenholtz (1902–1969), lawyer and activist
- John Hugenholtz (1914–1995), race track designer
- Nicolaas Marinus Hugenholtz (1924–2026), physicist

== Literature ==
- Nederland's Patriciaat 14 (1924).
