= John MacLaughlin (priest) =

Irish Anglican priest

John MacLaughlin was an Irish Anglican priest.

MacLaughlin was born in County Londonderry and educated at Trinity College, Dublin. He held livings at Killukin and Creeve. MacLaughlin was Archdeacon of Elphin in 1761 until 1769. He was then Prebendary of Tirbrien in Elphin Cathedral from 1769 until 1777.
