= John McLaughlin (footballer, born 1944) =

Scottish footballer (born 1944)

Personal information
- Date of birth: 23 January 1944
- Place of birth: Cambuslang, Scotland
- Date of death: 15 July 2011 (aged 67)
- Place of death: Glasgow, Scotland
- Position: Left half

Youth career
- Bonar Bridge

Senior career*
Years	Team	Apps	(Gls)
1960–1974	Queen's Park	148	(11)
- * Club domestic league appearances and goals

John H. McLaughlin (23 January 1944 – 15 July 2011) was a Scottish amateur footballer who made over 140 appearances as a left half in the Scottish League for Queen's Park.
