= John Loughlin =

John Loughlin may refer to:

- John Loughlin (bishop) (1817–1891), first bishop of Brooklyn, New York
- John Loughlin (political scientist) (born c. 1948), British political science professor
- John J. Loughlin, Jr. (born 1959), politician

== See also ==
- John Laughlin (disambiguation)
- John McLoughlin (disambiguation)
