= Jack O'Loughlin (Australian footballer) =

Australian rules footballer and umpire (1873–1960)

Personal information
- Full name: John Joseph O'Loughlin
- Born: 10 August 1873; Geelong
- Died: 8 August 1960 (aged 86); Geelong
- Original team: Footscray (VFA)

Playing career^{1}
Years	Club	Games (Goals)
1898, 1901	Geelong	22 (1)
1902	St Kilda	3 (1)
Total		25 (2)
- ^{1} Playing statistics correct to the end of 1902.

John Joseph O'Loughlin (10 August 1873 – 8 August 1960) was an Australian rules footballer who played for Geelong and St Kilda and an umpire in the Victorian Football League (VFL).

O'Loughlin started his career at Geelong in 1898 and also spent 1901 at Geelong for 22 matches and then played at St Kilda for three matches in 1902.

When boundary umpires were introduced to the VFL in 1904, O'Loughlin was one of the first appointed. He officiated in 91 matches until 1910, including the 1909 Grand Final, and also field umpired in country Victoria.
