= John C. McLaughlin =

American philologist

John Cameron McLaughlin (December 1, 1921 − June 16, 2013) was an American philologist who for many years served as Professor of English and Linguistics at the University of Iowa.

== Biography ==
John Cameron Mclaughlin was born in Albany, New York, on December 1, 1921 to Allan A. and Ethel M. (MacDonald) McLaughlin. From 1942 to 1946 McLaughlin served in World War II as a heavy machine gun platoon leader of the 43rd Infantry Division in the Solomon Islands and the Philippines. During this time he received a Purple Heart and four battle stars.

After the war McLaughlin pursued a career in academia. He earned a master's degree in 1952 at the University of Toledo with the thesis Joseph Conrad: Persistent Stylistic Habits and Meaning, and completed his Ph.D. in 1960 at Indiana University with the dissertation A Graphemic-Phonemic Study of a Middle English Manuscript, later published as a book. He then served for 35 years as Professor of English and Linguistics at the University of Iowa. He died at his home in Portage, Michigan, on June 16, 2013.

== Books ==
McLaughlin was the author of:

- A Graphemic-Phonemic Study of a Middle English Manuscript, 1963
- Aspects of the History of English, 1970
- Old English Syntax: A Handbook, 1983
