= The Danish Animal Protection Act =

The Danish Animal Protection Act is a Danish law against animal cruelty.

As stated in § 1, the law protects animals' living conditions. The Danish Animal Protection Act provides regulations against animal cruelty.

== Maximum penalty ==
If the animal is being treated irresponsibly, the owner will be punished with either a fine or imprisonment for up to 1 year.

== See also ==
- Animal welfare and rights in Denmark
