= McLaughlin (surname) =

McLaughlin Mac Lochlainn
- Language: Gaeilge

Origin
- Meaning: "son of Lochlann"
- Region of origin: Ireland

Other names
- Variant forms: Laughlin/Loughlin, McClaughlin, McGlothin, McLachlan/MacLachlan, McLachlin, McLauchlan, McLauchlin, McLaughlan, M(a)cLochlan, M(a)cLoughlin, MacLaughlan,

M(a)cLaughlin /mɪˈklɒxlɪn/ is the most common Anglicized form of Mac Lochlainn, a masculine surname of Irish origin. The feminine form of the surname is Nic Lochlainn. The literal meaning of the name is "son of Lochlann". Note that Mc is simply a contraction of Mac, which is also (albeit rarely) truncated to M. Thus, MacLaughlin, McLaughlin and M'Laughlin are the same Anglicism, the latter two merely contractions of the first.

The original surname Mac/Nic Lochlainn was borne by a family of Cenél nEógain, a branch of the historic northern O'Neill dynasty, reputedly founded by Niall Noígíallach. This family expanded across the North Channel into Scotland, where it became the Clan MacLachlan.

M(a)cLaughlin is sometimes used as a modern form of O'Melaghlin/Melaghlin, which is more commonly modernised McLoughlin, M'Loughlin, and O'Loughlin (among other spellings). O'Melaghlin was a phonetic rendering into Anglo-Norman and Middle English of ó Mǽilsheáchlainn. That family is part of the historic Clann Cholmáin, a branch of the Southern Uí Néill, cousins to the Northern Uí Néill. Ó/Ní M(h)ǽilsheáchlainn was the surname chosen by the descendants of Máel Sechnaill II, King of Meath, 976–1022, and High King of Ireland, 979–1002 & 1014–1022.

M(a)cLaughlin and M(a)cLoughlin are rarely English forms of the surname ó/ní Lachtna, a phonetic corruption of the much more common Loughney or M(a)cLoughney.

Unlike Irish surnames that have only one Gaelic source for their English form, it is not possible to tell by the spelling McLaughlin and other English spellings whether the person bearing the name is descended from the Mac/Nic Lochlainn family, the Ó/Ní M(h)ǽilsheáchlainn family, or the Ó/Ní Lachtna family.

== People ==
- Alan C. McLaughlin, Scottish cinematographer
- Alana McLaughlin, American, US Army special forces, Mixed Martial Arts athlete, Transgender woman
- Alden McLaughlin, Premier, second elected member for the district George Town, Grand Cayman, Cayman Islands
- Alford L. McLaughlin, American, USMC, (1928–1977), Medal of Honor recipient
- Andrew C. McLaughlin, American historian of Scottish immigrant parents
- Ann McLaughlin Korologos, (formerly known as Ann Dore McLaughlin) was United States Secretary of Labor from 1987 to 1989
- Anneisha McLaughlin, a Jamaican sprinter who specializes in the 200 metres
- Anthony McLaughlin, Canadian, a farmer and political figure in Prince Edward Island
- Audrey McLaughlin, former leader of Canada's New Democratic Party
- Barry McLaughlin, a Scottish former professional footballer
- Benny McLaughlin, a former U.S. soccer forward who starred in the American Soccer League
- Bernard "Bernie" McLaughlin, Irish-American gangster from Charlestown, Massachusetts and leader of "The McLaughlin Brothers" gang
- Bernard Joseph McLaughlin, American Bishop of the Roman Catholic Church
- Betsy McLaughlin, American, the current CEO of Hot Topic, Inc. and founder of Torrid
- Bill McLaughlin, Australian Rugby Union player and President of the Australian Rugby Union
- Billy McLaughlin, new age acoustic guitarist, composer and producer from Minnesota, United States
- Bo McLaughlin, American, a Major League Baseball pitcher
- Brian McLaughlin (footballer born 1954), Scottish footballer, whose clubs include Celtic and Motherwell
- Brian McLaughlin (footballer born 1974), Scottish footballer, whose clubs include Celtic and Wigan Athletic
- Brian McLaughlin (politician), former American Democratic politician from Flushing, Queens
- Bruce McLaughlin, Canadian politician who served as a Member of the Northwest Territories Legislature
- Byron McLaughlin, American, a former professional baseball player
- Caleb McLaughlin, American, an actor, mainly known for playing Lucas Sinclair in Stranger Things
- Charles Borromeo McLaughlin, American, the first bishop of the Roman Catholic Diocese of Saint Petersburg
- Charles F. McLaughlin, American, Nebraska Democratic politician
- Chase McLaughlin (born 1996), American football player
- Chester B. McLaughlin (1856–1929), New York lawyer and politician
- Chris McLaughlin (journalist), British journalist, who since 2004 has been editor of the Labour Party-supporting weekly UK magazine Tribune
- Christian McLaughlin (television writer), American, a television writer, producer, and author
- Claire McLaughlin, Northern Ireland rugby union player
- Corinne McLaughlin, Scottish, author and a leader in the intentional communities movement
- Dan McLaughlin, American, a professional sports broadcaster who currently works on both St. Louis Cardinals and St. Louis Blues telecasts
- David McLaughlin (disambiguation), several people
- Dean Benjamin McLaughlin, American astronomer
- Dean McLaughlin (writer), American science fiction writer, and son of Dean B. McLaughlin
- Denis McLaughlin, Irish footballer currently playing for RS Gimnástica de Torrelavega as a striker
- Dennis McLaughlin, American engineer
- Dominic McLaughlin (born 2013/2014), Scottish actor
- Donal McLaughlin, American architect and designer of the Flag of the United Nations
- W. Earle McLaughlin, a Canadian banker
- Edward F. McLaughlin, Jr., American politician who served as Lieutenant Governor for the Commonwealth of Massachusetts
- Edward McLaughlin (gangster), American, a former boxer and a member of the "McLaughlin Brothers" gang of Charlestown, Massachusetts
- Elizabeth McLaughlin, American actress
- Ellen McLaughlin, American playwright and actor for stage and film
- Emily McLaughlin, American soap opera actress
- Emma McLaughlin, American novelist
- Frank McLaughlin (disambiguation), several people
- Frederic McLaughlin, American, the first owner of the Chicago Black Hawks
- Gayle McLaughlin, American, the Green Party mayor of the city of Richmond, California and a member of Richmond's City Council
- George Vincent McLaughlin, President of the Brooklyn Trust Company; New York City Police Commissioner; State Superintendent of Banks; and Vice Chairman of the Triborough Bridge and Tunnel Authority
- Gibb McLaughlin, English film actor
- Grace McLaughlin, U.S artistic gymnast
- Hugh McLaughlin (footballer), Australian rules footballer who played with South Melbourne and Footscray in the VFL during the 1930s
- Hugh McLaughlin (politician) (1827–1904), American politician and political boss
- Hugh McLaughlin (publisher) (1918–2006), Irish publisher and inventor
- Isabel McLaughlin (1903–2002), Canadian painter, patron and philanthropist
- Jake McLaughlin (born 1982), American military and actor
- Jaleel McLaughlin (born 2000), American football player
- James McLaughlin (Indian agent) (1842–1923), U.S. Indian Service Agent & Inspector, ordered the 1890 arrest of Sitting Bull
- James C. McLaughlin (1858–1932), U.S. Representative from Michigan
- Janice McLaughlin (1942–2021), American nun, missionary, and human rights activist
- James "Kid" McLaughlin (1888–1914), 20th-century baseball player (1914 Cincinnati Reds)
- James Wellington McLaughlin, Canadian, Ontario doctor and political figure
- Jason McLaughlin (American soccer), American soccer player, currently plays both midfielder and forward for the Atlanta Silverbacks of the USL First Division
- Jason McLaughlin, American perpetrator of the 2003 Rocori High School shooting
- Jim McLaughlin (coach), American volleyball coach
- Jim McLaughlin (footballer), a former Northern Irish footballer
- Jim McLaughlin (jockey), an American thoroughbred race horse jockey
- Joe McLaughlin (footballer), Scottish, a retired professional footballer who played for Chelsea
- Joey McLaughlin, American, a right-handed relief pitcher who played for the Atlanta Braves, Toronto Blue Jays, and Texas Rangers
- John McLaughlin (disambiguation), several people
- Jon McLaughlin, American pop/rock singer-songwriter
- Joseph McLaughlin (disambiguation), several people
- Jud McLaughlin, American, a relief pitcher in Major League Baseball who played for the Boston Red Sox
- Keauna McLaughlin, American pair skater
- Kevin McLaughlin (rugby player), a professional rugby union player from Ireland
- Kiaran McLaughlin, American Thoroughbred racehorse trainer
- Leon McLaughlin, American, offensive lineman who played five seasons in the NFL
- Louisa McLaughlin (1836–1921) British Red Cross nurse in the Franco-Prussian War: Joseph Lister used her nursing home
- Marc McLaughlin (born 1999), American ice hockey player
- Marie McLaughlin, a Scottish operatic soprano
- Mark McLaughlin, Scottish footballer currently playing for Scottish Premier League club Hamilton Academical
- Martin McLaughlin (academic), professor of Italian and Fiat-Serena Professor of Italian Studies at the University of Oxford
- Martin McLaughlin (politician), member of the Illinois House of Representatives
- Mary A. McLaughlin, (born 1946), American federal judge
- Mary A. McLaughlin, known more commonly as Mary A. Clem, American mathematician, and a human computer.
- Mary Ann McLaughlin, American cardiologist
- Mary C. McLaughlin (died 2014), American public health official
- Mary Louise McLaughlin, American ceramic painter and studio potter from Cincinnati, Ohio
- Marya McLaughlin (1928–1998), American television journalist
- Mel McLaughlin, Australian television presenter
- Melvin O. McLaughlin, American, a Nebraska republican politician
- Michael McLaughlin (disambiguation), several people, including Mike McLaughlin
- Michelle McLaughlin, American, was Playboy's Playmate of the Month for February 2008
- Mignon McLaughlin, American journalist, Glamour Magazine editor and author born in 1913
- Mitchel McLaughlin, Northern Ireland, the former General Secretary of Sinn Féin and an MLA
- Moses A. McLaughlin, Irish born, Union Army officer, farmer, later a doctor; known for his role in the Keyesville Massacre, and victorious campaign in the Owens Valley Indian War
- Pádraig Mac Lochlainn, Irish member of parliament (TD) for Donegal North East, Sinn Féin spokesperson on Foreign Affairs and Trade
- Pat McLaughlin, American, a successful singer/songwriter in Nashville, TN
- Patricia McLaughlin, a unionist politician in Northern Ireland and one of the earliest female Members of Parliament from the region
- Patrick McLaughlin (disambiguation), several people
- Paul McLaughlin (disambiguation), several people
- Peter McLaughlin (Minnesota politician), American politician
- Rhett McLaughlin, American internet personality, part of the comedy duo Rhett and Link
- Robert McLaughlin (industrialist) (1836–1921), Canadian industrialist and businessman
- Robert McLaughlin (RAF officer) (1896–?), British World War I flying ace
- Robert E. McLaughlin (1908–1973), American journalist and author
- Robert Enoch McLaughlin (1907–1978), Washington, DC politician
- Robert H. McLaughlin (1877–1939), American novelist, playwright and theater manager
- Rob McLaughlin, Canadian journalist and digital media producer
- Ryan McLaughlin, Northern Irish footballer
- Samuel McLaughlin, a Canadian businessman
- Sara Agnes Mclaughlin Conboy (born Sara Agnes Mclaughlin), a labor organizer in the United States
- Scott McLaughlin (racing driver), New Zealand professional racing driver currently competing in the IndyCar Series
- Scott McLaughlin (footballer), Scottish footballer
- Sean McLaughlin (disambiguation), multiple people
- Seán William McLoughlin, Irish YouTuber
- Seth McLaughlin (born 2001), American football player
- Steve McLaughlin (disambiguation), several people
- Sydney McLaughlin, American athlete specialized in the 400m hurdles and world record holder.
- Theresa Marie Korn née McLaughlin (1926–2020), American engineer, daughter-in-law of Arthur Korn
- Warren McLaughlin, American left-handed pitcher with the Philadelphia Phillies and Pittsburgh Pirates from 1900 to 1903
- William F. McLaughlin (Michigan), American politician from the State of Michigan

== See also ==
- Lochlann
- McLaughlan
- McLaughlin group (mathematics), a sporadic finite simple group
- The McLaughlin Group, a weekly public affairs program broadcast in the United States
- McLoughlin
