= Serua (Fijian Communal Constituency, Fiji) =

Former electoral constituency in Fiji

Serua Fijian Provincial Communal is a former electoral division of Fiji, one of 23 communal constituencies reserved for indigenous Fijians. Established by the 1997 Constitution, it came into being in 1999 and was used for the parliamentary elections of 1999, 2001, and 2006. (Of the remaining 48 seats, 23 were reserved for other ethnic communities and 25, called Open Constituencies, were elected by universal suffrage). The electorate was coextensive with Serua Province.

The 2013 Constitution promulgated by the Military-backed interim government abolished all constituencies and established a form of proportional representation, with the entire country voting as a single electorate.

== Election results ==
In the following tables, the primary vote refers to first-preference votes cast. The final vote refers to the final tally after votes for low-polling candidates have been progressively redistributed to other candidates according to pre-arranged electoral agreements (see electoral fusion), which may be customized by the voters (see instant run-off voting).

In the 2001 election, Joketani Cokanasiga won with more than 50 percent of the primary vote; therefore, there was no redistribution of preferences.

=== 1999 ===
Candidate	Political party	Votes (primary)	%	Votes (final)	%
Lepani Tonitonivanua	Nationalist Vanua Tako Lavo Party (NVTLP)	768	22.96	2,098	62.72
Misaele Driubalavu	Soqosoqo ni Vakavulewa ni Taukei (SVT)	1,131	33.81	1,247	37.28
Sakeasi Lomalagi	Fijian Association Party (FAP)	630	18.83	...	...
Semi Tabaiwalu	Independent	399	11.93	...	...
Josateki Nasova	Christian Democratic Alliance	364	10.88	...	...
Atunaisa Lacabuka Rasoki II	(NDP)	13	0.39	...	...
Total		3,345	100.00	3,345	100.00

=== 2001 ===
Candidate	Political party	Votes	%
Joketani Cokanasiga	Soqosoqo Duavata ni Lewenivanua (SDL)	1,912	62.61
Jona Rokowai	Conservative Alliance (CAMV)	427	13.98
Misaele Driubalavu	Soqosoqo ni Vakavulewa ni Taukei (SVT)	268	8.87
Lepani Tonitonivanua	Nationalist Vanua Tako Lavo Party (NVTLP)	237	7.76
Sakeasi Lomalagi	Fijian Association Party (FAP)	210	6.88
Total		3,054	100.00

=== 2006 ===
Candidate	Political party	Votes	%
Pio Kameli Tabaiwalu	Soqosoqo Duavata ni Lewenivanua (SDL)	2,792	77.51
Sakeasi Lomalagi	Independent	431	11.97
Ananaiasa Qio Vucago	Independent	232	6.44
Levani Tonitonivanua	Nationalist Vanua Tako Lavo Party (NVTLP)	147	4.08
Total		3,602	100.00

== Sources ==
- Psephos - Adam Carr's electoral archive
- Fiji Facts
