= Deuba (town) =

- Town
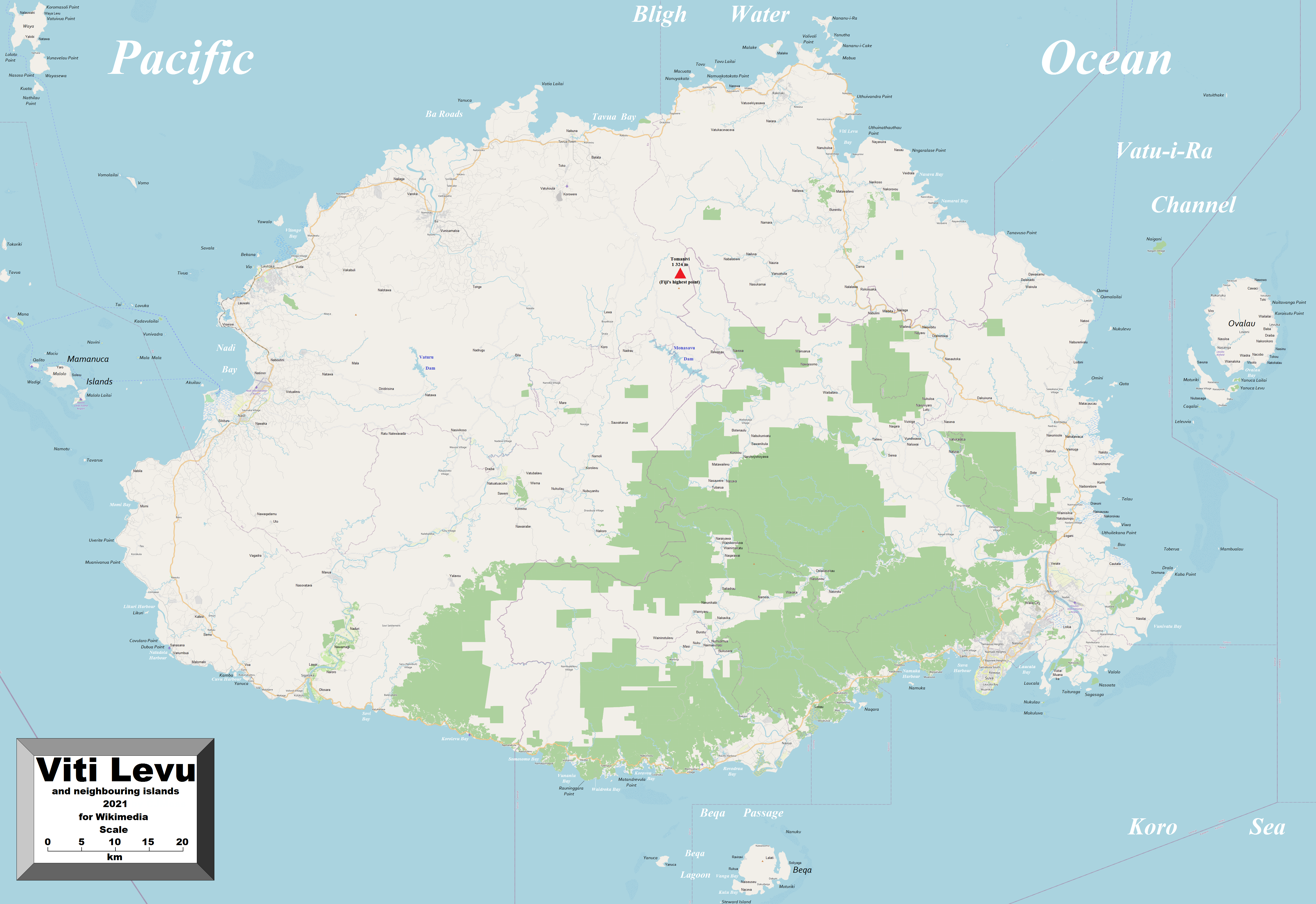
- Viti Levu with Deuba on the south coast

- Location in Fiji
- Coordinates: 18°15′S 177°55′E
- Country: Fiji
- Island: Viti Levu
- Division: Central Division
- Province: Serua

Population (2009)
  - Total: 1,881
- Time zone: UTC+12

Deuba (Fijian pronunciation: [ndeu̯mba]) is a town in Fiji, located in the Central District and Serua Province, on the island of Viti Levu. According to estimates for the year 2009, it had 1,881 inhabitants.
