= Yanuca =

Yanuca Yanutha
- Island
- Location in Fiji
- Country: Fiji
- Archipelago: Viti Levu Group
- Division: Central Division
- Province: Serua
- Tikina: Serua

Area
  - Total: 1.5 km^{2} (0.58 sq mi)
- Elevation: 100 m (330 ft)

Yanuca (Fijian pronunciation: [jaˈnuða], also known as Yanutha in English) is an inhabited coral island in Fiji. It is administratively part of Serua province. The island has a land area of 1.5 square kilometres (1 square mile) and reaches a maximum elevation of 100 metres (330 feet).

Yanuca is characterized by white sandy beaches and lush vegetation, and is now a camping site. To the east is the island of Beqa.

== See also ==
- Yanuca Lailai
- Yanuca Levu
