= Pacific Harbour =

Pacific Harbour पेसीफिक हार्बर (Fiji Hindi)
- Town
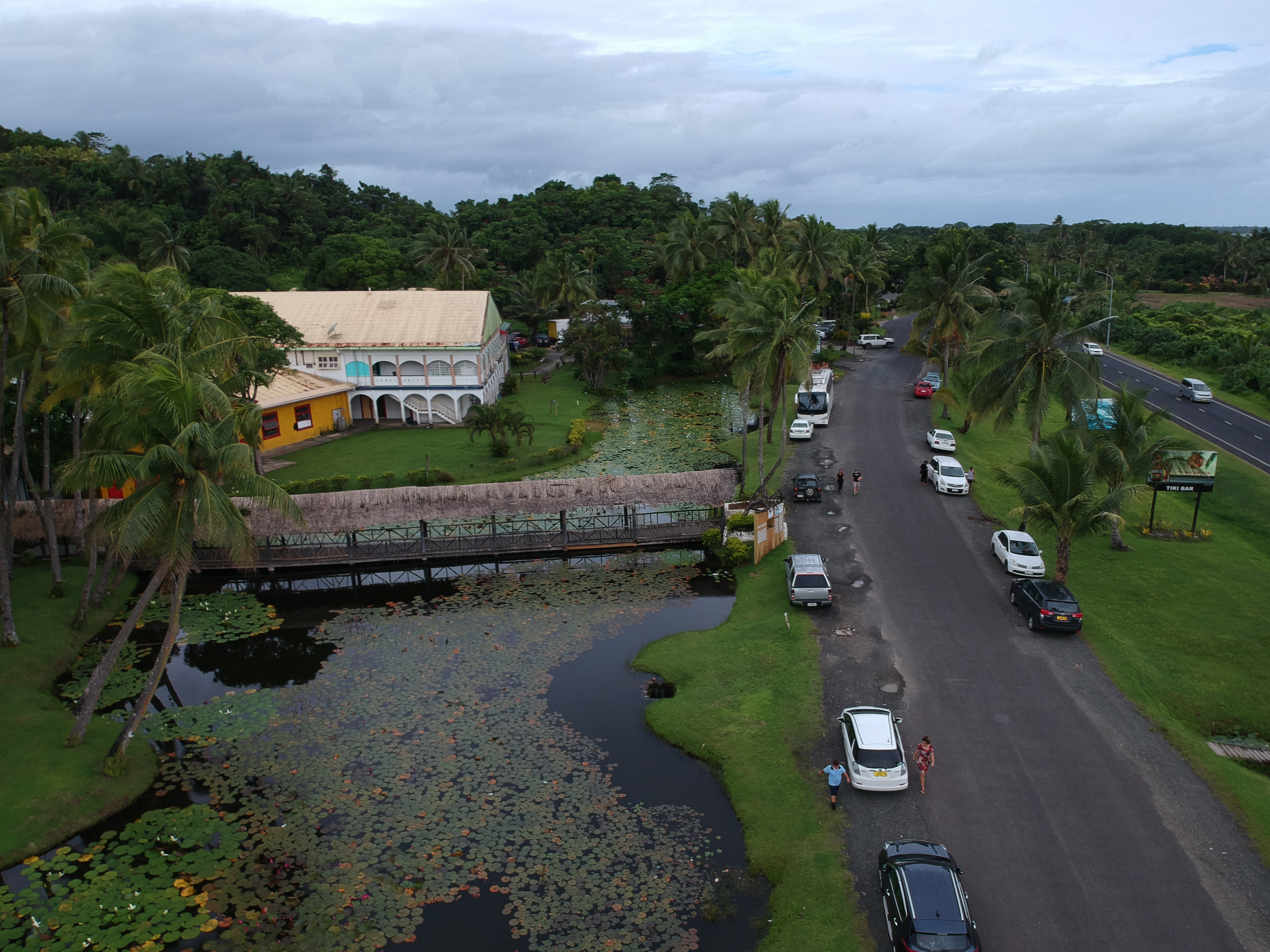

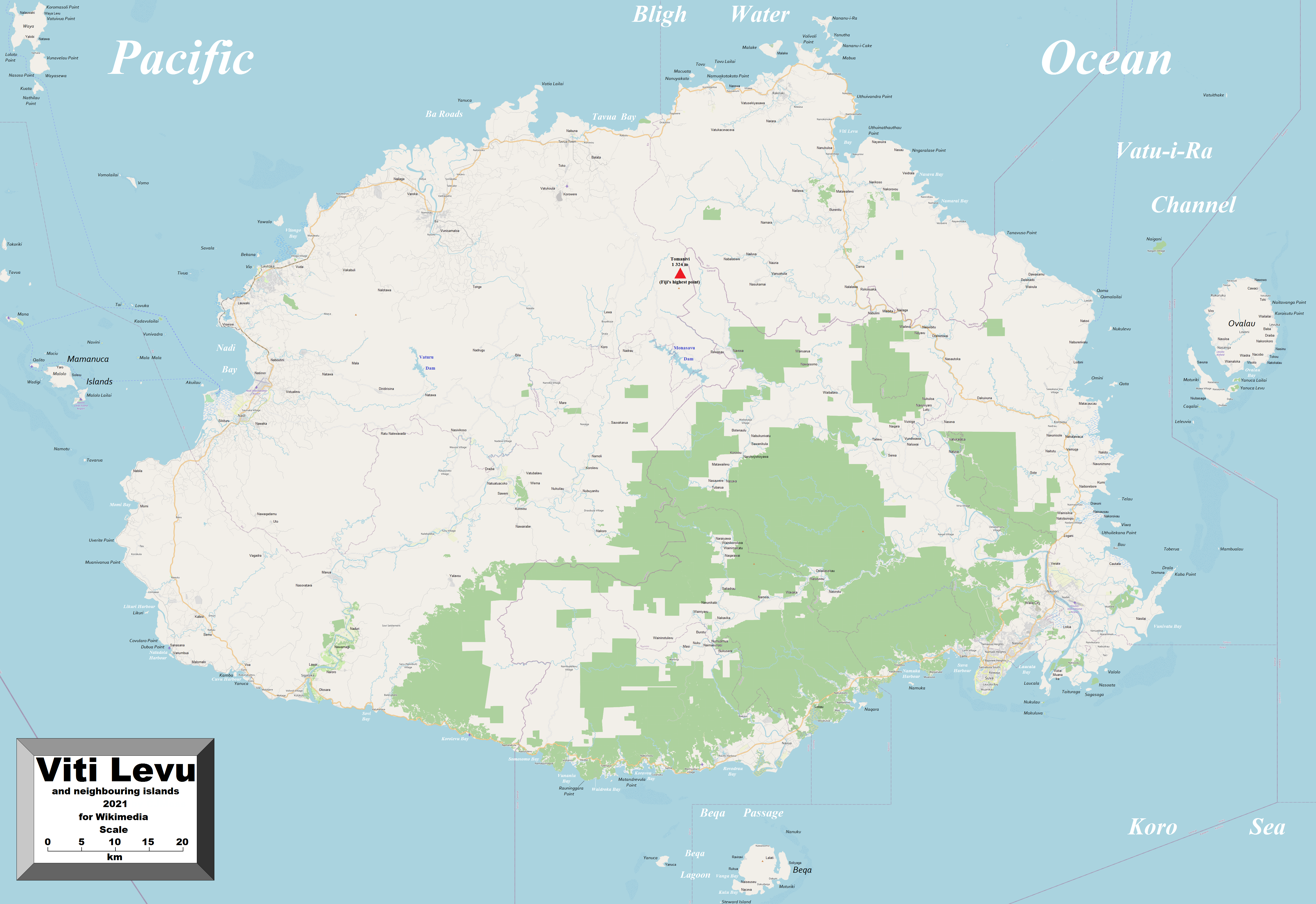
- Viti Levu with Pacific Harbour on the south coast

- Location in Fiji
- Coordinates: 18°14′24″S 178°3′36″E
- Country: Fiji
- Island: Viti Levu
- Division: Central Division
- Province: Serua

Population (2009)
  - Total: 1,874
- Time zone: UTC+12

Pacific Harbour is a town in Fiji, located in the Central District and Serua Province, on the island of Viti Levu. It is situated 12 kilometers to the west of Navua.

According to estimates for the year 2009, it had 1,874 inhabitants. It has a primary school, a health care, a bank, shopping outlets, a service station, a market, restaurants, villas, resorts, hotels, a marina, a sports ground, a police post, a post office, a taxi stand, bus shelters, and the Deuba airport.

Known as the adventure capital of Fiji, the village offers aquatic activities such as shark diving and river rafting and is the gateway to Beqa Island, known for its coral reefs.
