= McLachlan =

McLachlan (/məˈklɒxlən/ mə-KLOKH-lən), MacLachlan or McLaglen is a surname. It is derived from the Irish MacLachlainn, which is in turn a patronymic form of the Gaelic personal name Lachlann. Notable people with the surname include:

== McLachlan ==
- Alexander McLachlan (politician) (1872–1956), Australian senator
- Alexander McLachlan (poet) (1818–1896), Scottish-born Canadian poet
- Andrew McLachlan (born 1966), Australian politician, army man and lawyer
- Angus McLachlan (born 1944), Australian pastoralist and former first-class cricketer
- Ben McLachlan (born 1992), New Zealand–Japanese tennis player
- C. Ian McLachlan (born 1942), justice of the Connecticut Supreme Court
- Craig McLachlan (born 1965), Australian actor and singer
- Ed McLachlan (1940–2024), English cartoonist and illustrator
- George McLachlan (1901–1964), Scottish footballer
- Ian McLachlan (born 1936), Australian landowner
- James McLachlan (disambiguation), multiple people
- Jimmy McLachlan, Scottish footballer
- John McLachlan (disambiguation), multiple people
- Jon McLachlan (1949–2024), New Zealand rugby union player
- Laurentia McLachlan (1866–1953), Scottish Benedictine nun
- Mark McLachlan (born 1990), American product and game designer
- Michael A. McLachlan (born 1958), American politician
- Mike McLachlan (1946–2021), American politician
- Robert McLachlan (disambiguation), multiple people
- Roger McLachlan (1954–2025), New Zealand bass guitarist based in Australia
- Sarah McLachlan (born 1968), Canadian musician
- Tanner McLachlan (born 1999), Canadian American football player
- Tom McLachlan (1912–1986), Australian rugby league footballer
- Virginia McLachlan (born 1992), Canadian Paralympic sprinter

== MacLachlan ==
- Angus MacLachlan (born 1959), playwright and screenwriter
- Crawford Maclachlan (1867–1952), British admiral
- Ewen MacLachlan (1775–1822), Scottish Gaelic scholar and poet
- Kyle MacLachlan (born 1959), American actor
- Malcolm MacLachlan, Professor of Global Health at Trinity College Dublin
- Patricia MacLachlan (1938–2022), American children's writer
- Ross MacLachlan (born 1957), Canadian singer and pianist
- James MacLachlan (1919–1943), British Royal Air Force pilot and flying ace of the Second World War

== McLaglen ==
- Victor McLaglen (1886–1959), British-born American actor

== Clan ==
- Clan Maclachlan, Scottish clan

== Fictional characters ==
- Ryan McLachlan, fictional character
- Tiffany McLachlan, fictional character

== See also ==
- McLachlin (surname)
- McLoughlin
- Lachlan (disambiguation)
- McLoughlin, for the Irish origins of the name
