= Nuku District =

Nuku District may refer to:

- Nuku District, Papua New Guinea
- Nuku District, Fiji
