= Murray McLachlan =

Murray McLachlan may refer to:

- Murray McLachlan (musician) (born 1965), British concert pianist
- Murray McLachlan (ice hockey) (born 1948), ice hockey goaltender
- Murray McLachlan (swimmer) (born 1941), South African swimmer

== See also ==
- Murray McLauchlan (born 1948), Canadian singer, songwriter and musician
- McLachlan (surname)
