= McLoughlin =

Family name

McLoughlin is an Irish surname.

== Origins ==
The surname Mac/Nic Lochlainn originated in the Irish province of Ulster. Lochlann was originally a name for Scandinavia, especially Norway, so called after the fjords – Lochlainn, the adjectival form, literally means "lake-ish" or "full of lakes," a "land of lakes," etc. The Annals of Ulster refer to the Vikings as Lochlannach meaning "of Lochlann." A small DNA sample size; so far, shows the clans origins are in Donegal

Lochlan(n)/Lochlain(n) is still used as a man's personal name in Ireland and Scotland, though not commonly. English forms of the surname Mac/Nic Lochlainn are concentrated in western Ulster, on both sides of the international boundary. But the family are found throughout Ulster, and spread eastward during the Middle Ages, across the North Channel into Scotland where they became the Clan MacLachlan. Spellings of the name peculiar to Scotland include McLachlan, McLachlin, and McLauchlan. The Mac/Nic Lochlainn and their Scottish cousins are descendants of the Northern Uí Néill.

The Ó/Ní Maoilsheachlainn surname originated in Meath. The family claim descent from High King Máel Sechnaill mac Domnaill of the Southern Uí Néill, relatives of the Northern family. The surname was originally rendered O'Melaghlin in Norman French and Middle English but was corrupted to McLoughlin and M'Loughlin in the 18th century.

The Lochnaigh family in Connaught, who claim descent from the Uí Fiachrach dynasty, mostly became Loughney in English but are very occasionally called McLoughlin. They tend to be concentrated in Galway.

== MacLoughlin of Cineál Eoghain ==
The McLoughlins of Ulster are part of the Cenél nEógain branch of the Northern Uí Néill. They ruled what is now Counties Tyrone, Londonderry and Donegal. High Kings of Ireland from this family were:

- Domnall Ua Lochlainn, reigned 1083–1121, with opposition.
- Muirchertach Mac Lochlainn, reigned 1156–1166.

== Ó Maoilsheachlainn of Clann Colman ==
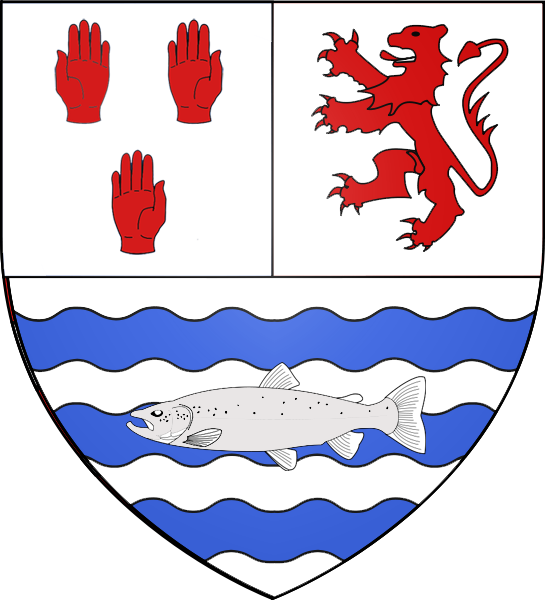
The O'Melaghlin.

The Ó Maoilsheachlainns of the Kingdom of Mide (presently the counties of Meath, Westmeath, and parts of the counties of Dublin, Kildare, Offaly, Longford, and Louth, all now in Leinster, and part of County Cavan, now in Ulster) are descendants of the Southern Uí Néill.

High Kings of Ireland of this family included:

- Conchobar mac Donnchada, reigned 819–833, with opposition.
- Máel Sechnaill mac Máele Ruanaid (a.k.a. Máel Sechnaill I), reigned 846–862.
- Flann Sinna, reigned 879–916.
- Donnchad Donn, reigned 919–944.
- Máel Sechnaill mac Domnaill (a.k.a. Máel Sechnaill II), reigned 980–1002, 1014–1022.

The Ó Máoilsheáchlainns of Meath lost their lands and their power in the centuries following the Norman Invasion – their homeland of Meath even losing its status as a kingdom/province and being absorbed into Leinster. The family were recorded as O'Melaghlin, and after the 17th century, McLoughlin.

== In Scotland ==
Badge of the Clan MacLachlan.

The Northern Uí Néill family expanded from Ulster into Argyll, in Scotland, where Middle Irish Mac/Nic Lochlainn became Modern Scots Gaelic Mac/Nic Lachlainn, most commonly spelled MacLachlan in Scots and English.

See the Clan MacLachlan article for more information.

== People ==
- Alan McLoughlin (1967–2021), Irish professional football player and coach
- Coleen Rooney (née McLoughlin) (born 1986), English media personality
- Colin McLoughlin, 20th-century British freelance writer, brother of Denis
- Collin McLoughlin, 21st-century American record producer and songwriter
- Denis McLoughlin (1918–2002), British illustrator, brother of Colin
- Emmett McLoughlin (1907–1970), American Catholic priest and low-income housing advocate
- Ellis McLoughlin (born 1990), American soccer player
- Fionn McLoughlin (born 1982), Irish rugby union player
- James McLoughlan (1830–1913), Newfoundland merchant and politician
- James McLoughlin (1929–2005), Irish Catholic priest, Bishop of Galway, Kilmacduagh and Kilfenora (1993–2005)
- James G. McLoughlin (1919–2004), American military veteran and publisher
- Dr. Jean-Baptiste/John McLoughlin (1784–1857), Quebec-born American fur trader and Oregon Country pioneer
- Keith McLoughlin (born 1956), American corporate executive
- Maurice McLoughlin (1890–1957), American tennis player
- Nigel McLoughlin (born 1968), Irish poet, editor and teacher
- Tom McLoughlin (born 1950), American film director and screenwriter
- Tony McLoughlin (born 1949), Irish politician
- William McLoughlin, 20th-century football player

=== Disambiguation pages ===
- Patrick McLoughlin (disambiguation)
- Paul McLoughlin (disambiguation)
- Seán McLoughlin (disambiguation)
