= Leonidas (ship) =

Leonidas (named after king Leonidas I of Sparta) was a labour transport ship (schooner) that played an important role in the history of Fiji. She had been earlier used to carry indentured labourers to the West Indies, having transported 580 Indian indentured labourers to St Lucia in 1878. Captained by McLachlan, the ship departed from Calcutta, India on 3 March 1879 and arrived at Levuka, Fiji, on 14 May that year. The indentured labourers who disembarked were the first of over 61,000 to arrive from the Indian subcontinent over the following 37 years, forming the nucleus of the Fiji Indian community that now numbers close to forty per cent of Fiji's population.

== Cholera and smallpox aboard the ship ==
A total of 498 passengers made up of 273 men, 146 women and 79 children under twelve years of age, had embarked on the ship in Calcutta. While only three days out to sea there was an outbreak of cholera and smallpox aboard the ship. Despite efforts by the Surgeon Superintendent to isolate the infected passengers, 17 died before the ship arrived in Levuka, after a journey of 72 days. Since there was no quarantine facility in Levuka, it was decided to anchor the ship some distance from Levuka on the leeward side. While attempting to reach the selected anchorage point, the ship went aground on a reef. The gravity of the situation was all too vivid in the minds of the Government officials as only four years earlier a measles epidemic had wiped out 40,000 Fijians. At high tide the ship floated off the reef and was safely anchored.

== Quarantine at sea ==
The Chief Medical Officer of the colony, Dr McGregor, devised an ingenious method of effectively preventing the infection reaching the shore, during the process of sending stores, letters, etc., to the ship. A stage was erected on the outer reef using trestles of hardwood, with a moving platform. Stores necessary to the ship were placed on this platform at low tide and taken off by the ship's boat. All letters were placed in a carbolic acid bottle, and were fumigated before delivery. At high tide this was cleaned by the sea.

== Temporary quarantine station ==
Yanuca Lailai was chosen as a quarantine station but houses on it could accommodate only 350 people. Within days extra bures (Fijian houses) were constructed and the ship's passengers transferred to the island. Armed guards were placed in the narrow passage between Levuka and Yanuca Lailai, to prevent contact with the new arrivals. On several occasions warning shots had to be fired to prevent seamen trying to return to the Leonidas after dropping off their passengers. Fifteen more of the new arrivals died on the island due to dysentery, diarrhoea and typhoid, leaving only 463 survivors, before they were released from the island on 9 August 1879.

== Early voyages of Leonidas ==
- 8 September 1866 - The 110-ton schooner was in Auckland harbour.
- 23 November 1870 - Leonidas called into the Bay of Islands on her way to Fiji. She departed for Fiji on 27 November with its original cargo.

== See also ==
- Indian indenture system
- Indians in Fiji
- Indian indenture ships to Fiji

== Bibliography ==
- Fiji Times, 17 May 1879
- Fiji Government, The Colony of Fiji: 1874–1924, Government Printer, Suva, Fiji, 1925
- B.V. Lal, Chalo Jahaji: on a Journey through Indenture in Fiji, Australian National University, Canberra, 2000
