= Shangri-La's Fijian Resort =

Coordinates: 18°8′24.61″S 177°25′16.34″E

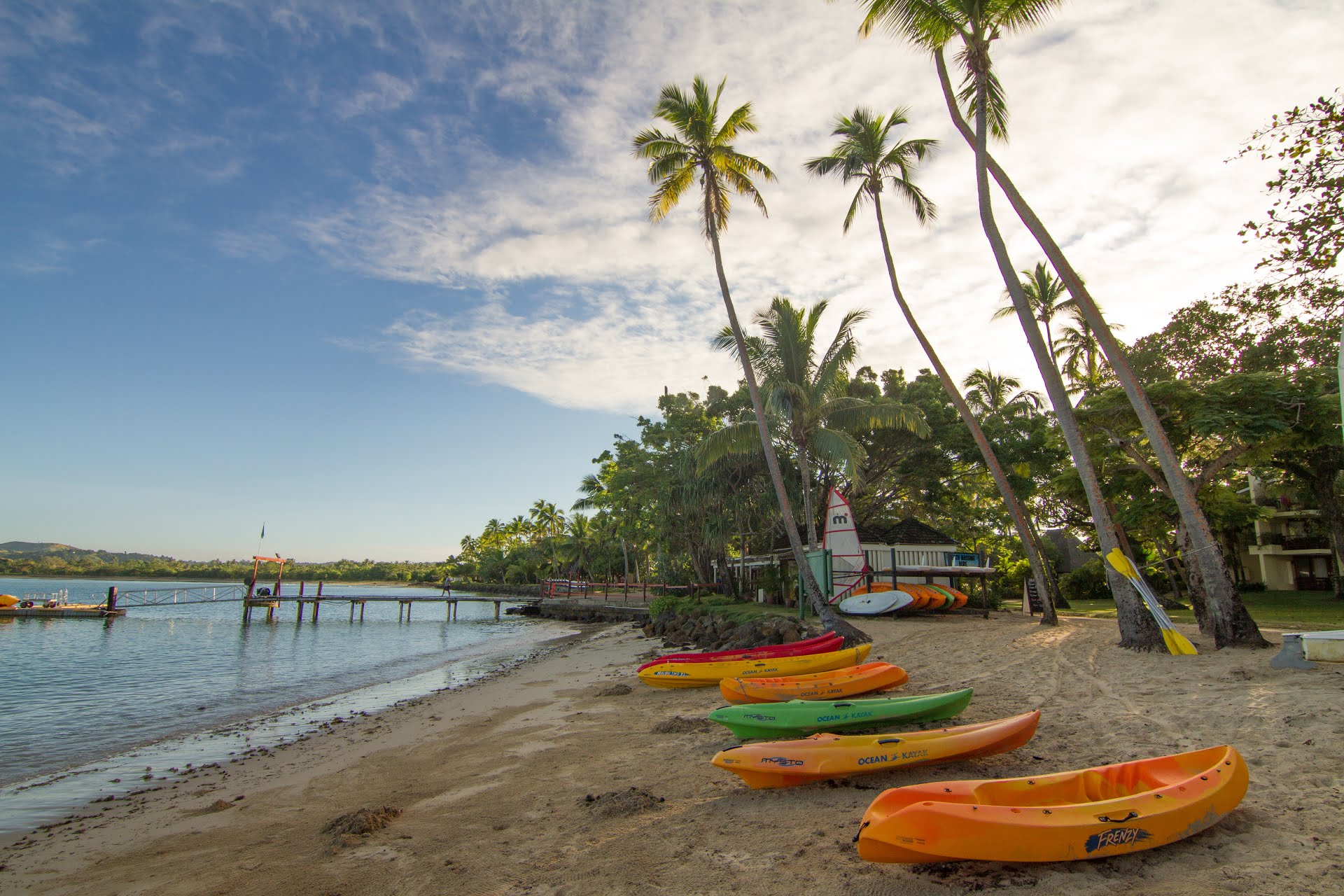
- Shangri-La Fijian Resort

General information
- Type: Hotel
- Location: Yanuca Island, Fiji
- Current tenants: Shangri-La Hotels and Resorts
- Opened: 1967

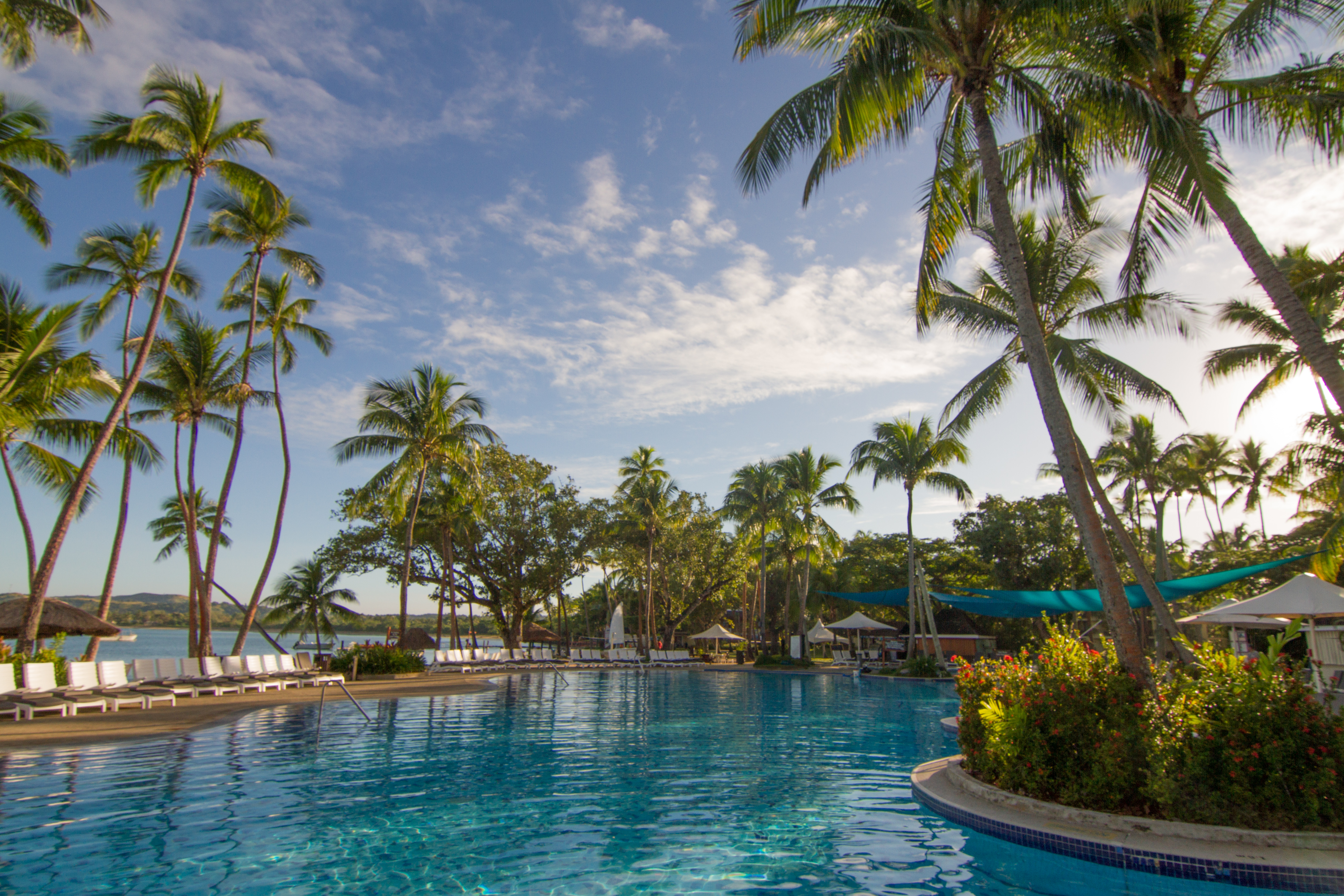
Main swimming pool

Shangri-La's Fijian Resort is a luxury resort located at Yanuca Island, on Viti Levu island, Cuvu, Sigatoka, Fiji. Currently managed by Shangri-La Hotels and Resorts, the resort originally opened in 1967. After Fiji's independence from Britain in 1970, local management was encouraged over expatriate management; Mr Andrew Thompson was appointed the first local General Manager at the age of 27. He took the resort to new heights and since then, the Fijian Hotel, as it was known then, has never looked back.

It has 436 rooms, with a renovation completed in July 2005. Its 610 sq m Davui Events Centre was opened in 2006. It has a number of restaurants serving Asian and international dishes, often with vegetarian options.

Among its recreation facilities are a 9-hole executive golf course designed by British Golf Open winner Peter Thomson and floodlit tennis courts. Shangri-La's Fijian Resort provides seaside weddings at the non-denominational Seaside Wedding Chapel, which can accommodate up to 42 guests.
