= James McLachlan =

James McLachlan may refer to:

- James McLachlan (American politician) (1852–1940), U.S. Representative from California
- James McLachlan (Australian politician) (1871–1956), Australian Senator from South Australia
- James McLachlan Sr., member of the South Australian House of Assembly
- James McLachlan (Victorian politician) (1862–1938), Australian politician
- James McLachlan (scholar), American scholar and theologian
- J. B. McLachlan (1869–1937), Canadian politician and labour leader
- James Douglas McLachlan (1869–1937), British wartime military attaché to Washington, D.C
- Jim McLachlan (born 1943), Canadian politician
- Jimmy McLachlan (1870–?), Scottish footballer

== See also ==
- James MacLachlan (1919–1943), British flying ace
