= Joketani Cokanasiga =

Fijian politician (1937–2021)

Joketani Cokanasiga (1936 or 1937 – 7 March 2021) was a Fijian politician, who served as Minister for Public Works and Energy in the interim Cabinet formed by Laisenia Qarase in the wake of the Fiji coup of 2000. He held office till an elected government took power in September 2001.

In early 2006, Cokanasiga found himself at the centre of an inquiry into alleged corruption in an agricultural affirmative action scheme during his time as a Minister. The Fiji Sun reported on 20 January that a letter to the prime minister and signed by Cokanasiga had condemned a Finance Ministry decision to suspend the program while an audit was in progress, describing the suspension as "political suicide." The letter, dated 8 August 2001, was marked "Confidential." The audit found a discrepancy of F$16 million in the accounts.

The Sun reported that Prime Minister Qarase had admitted the previous night that he had received the letter, but denied acting on it. "The 2001 general election was close by and the audit found that millions of dollars had been misused," he was quoted as saying.

The Fiji Village news service announced on 21 March 2006 that the ruling party, the Soqosoqo Duavata ni Lewenivanua (SDL) had decided not to renominate Cokanasiga for the general election, which was duly held on 6–13 May. He was succeeded as Member for the Serua Fijian Communal Constituency by Pio Tabaiwalu.

Cokanasiga was originally from Serua. He was a former civil servant who worked as a hotelier before reverting to farming.

On 15 August 2007, Cokanisiga accepted the invitation to be interim Minister for Fisheries and Forest in the government led by Frank Bainimarama.
