= Serua District =

Coordinates: 18°16′31.47″S 177°55′26.91″E

Serua District is a district in Serua Province in Fiji. According to the 2017 census, the district had a population of 16,366 inhabitants.

The biggest district in the Serua province encompassing a large land and Fisheries area. The island of Yanuca is part of the tikina.

Extends from the chiefly Serua Island, home to the chiefly No-i-Korolevu clan, extending to Navutulevu village near the Coral Coast and up to Nabukelevu village ancestral home of the Burenitu clan, in the upper reaches of the Navua river.
