= Frank McLoughlin =

Frank McLoughlin may refer to:

- Frank McLoughlin (politician) (born 1946), Irish Labour Party politician
- Frank McLoughlin (footballer)

== See also ==
- Frank McLaughlin (disambiguation)
