= McLaughlan =

The surname McLaughlan is a form of the surname McLaughlin (derived from the Irish Mac Lochlainn).

== People with the surname ==
- George McLaughlan (1904–?), Scottish footballer
- Murray McLauchlan (born 1948), Canadian singer and songwriter.
- Sandy McLaughlan (born 1936), Scottish footballer
- Sonja McLaughlan, BBC newsreader
