= Patrick McLaughlin =

Patrick McLaughlin is the name of:

- Paddy McLaughlin (footballer, born 1979), Northern Irish footballer and manager
- Paddy McLaughlin (footballer, born 1991), Northern Irish footballer
- Pat McLaughlin, singer-songwriter
- Pat McLaughlin (baseball) (1910–1999), American baseball player
- Pat McLaughlin (footballer) (1883–1916), English footballer
- Patrick McLaughlin (churchman) (1909–1988), English Anglican priest and later Roman Catholic lay brother
- Patrick McLaughlin (criminal) (1822–1858), New York City immigrant runner and bodyguard
- Patrick McLaughlin, alias of Scottish serial killer Peter Tobin (1946–2022)

== See also ==
- Patrick McLoughlin (disambiguation)
