= McLachlin (surname) =

McLachlin is a surname. Notable people with the surname include:

- Beth McLachlin (born 1950), American volleyball player and coach
- Beverley McLachlin, PC (born 1943), the former Chief Justice of Canada, the first woman to hold that position
- Daniel McLachlin (1810–1872), businessman and political figure in Canada West
- Parker McLachlin (born 1979), American professional golfer

== See also ==
- MacLachlainn, the Scottish Gaelic form of the name.
- List of Supreme Court of Canada cases (McLachlin Court) from the appointment of Beverley McLachlin as Chief Justice of Canada
- Reasons of the Supreme Court of Canada by Chief Justice McLachlin
