= Navua =

Navua नवुआ (Fiji Hindi)
- Town
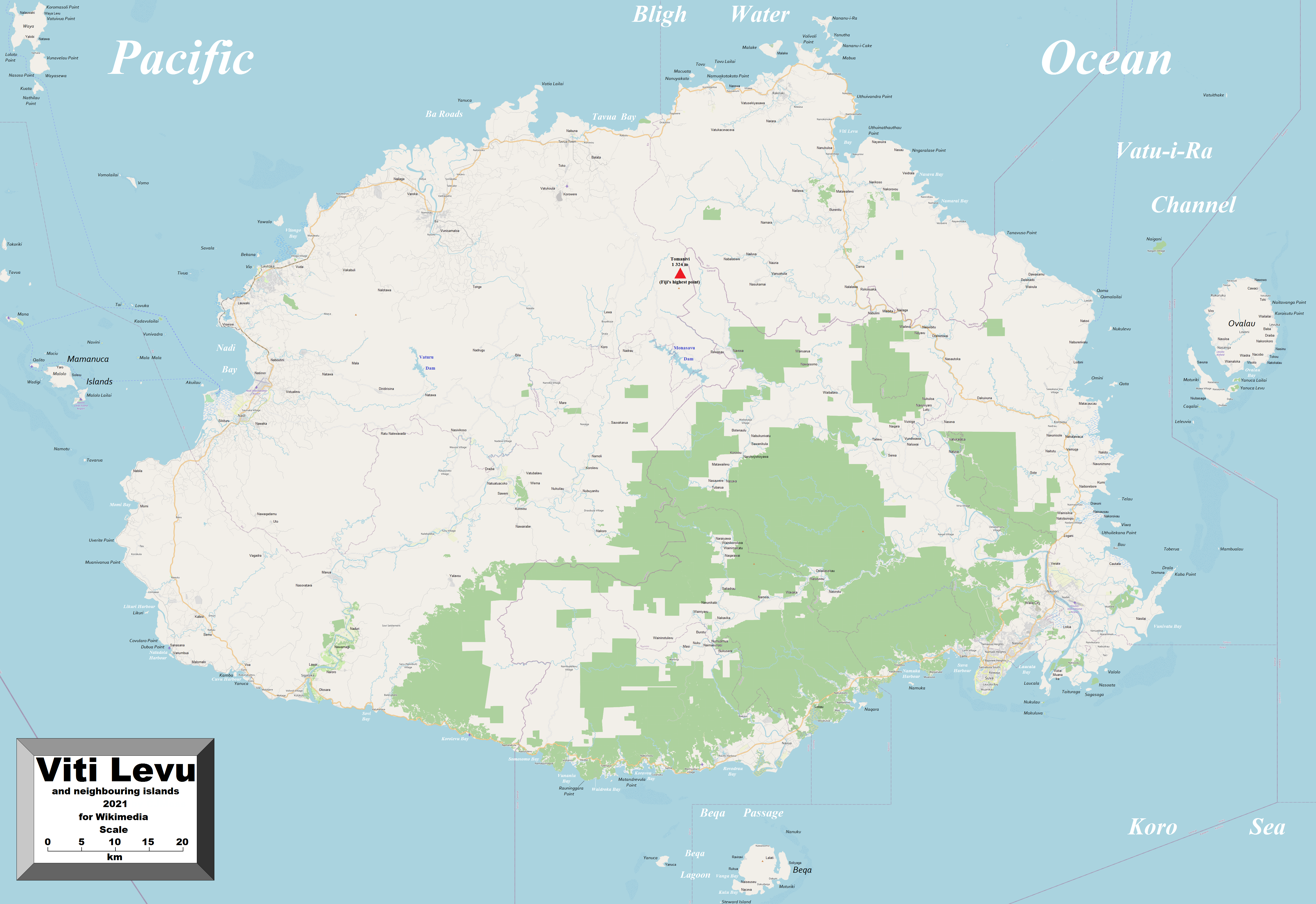
- Viti Levu with Navua on the south coast

- Location in Fiji
- Coordinates: 18°13′12″S 178°10′48″E
- Country: Fiji
- Island: Viti Levu
- Division: Central Division
- Province: Namosi; Serua

Population (2012)
  - Total: 5,421
- Time zone: UTC+12

Navua (Fijian pronunciation: [naβua]) is a town in Fiji, located in the Central District and Namosi and Serua Provinces, on the island of Viti Levu. It had a population of 5,421 in 2012.

Navua is one of the main locations of the Fijian food industry. During colonial times, several sugar factories were built in the town, which were closed in 1922 after an economic crisis.

The town hosts Navua FC, a football club that participates in the National Football League of Fiji.
