= Paul McLaughlin =

Paul McLaughlin may refer to:

- Paul McLaughlin (footballer) (born 1965), Scottish former footballer
- Paul McLaughlin (actor), New Zealand actor
- Paul McLaughlin (sailor) (1919–2000), Canadian Olympics sailor

== See also ==
- Paul McLachlan (fl. 1980s–2010s), Australian Army officer
- Paul McLoughlin (disambiguation)
