= Steve McLaughlin (disambiguation) =

Steve McLaughlin is an American football player.

Steve McLaughlin may also refer to:

- Steve McLaughlin, Scottish Grammy Award-winning music producer, who was member of the Scars
- Steven McLaughlin (born 1963), politician
- Stephen McLaughlin (born 1990), Irish football (soccer) player
