= Dennis McLaughlin =

Dennis McLaughlin is an American engineer, currently the H.M. King Bhumibol Professor at the Massachusetts Institute of Technology.

== Education ==
- B.S.E.E. 1966, Purdue University
- M.S.E. 1967, Princeton University
- Ph.D. 1985, Princeton University
