= Paul McLoughlin =

Paul McLoughlin may refer to:

- Paul McLoughlin (English footballer) (born 1963), English football forward and manager
- Paul McLoughlin (Gaelic footballer), Gaelic football manager and player

== See also ==
- Paul McLaughlin (disambiguation)
