= Joseph McLaughlin =

Joseph McLaughlin may refer to:

- Joe McLaughlin (footballer) (born 1960), Scottish professional footballer
- Joe McLaughlin (American football) (born 1957), American football player
- Joseph M. McLaughlin (1933–2013), American academic and US federal appellate court judge
- Joseph McLaughlin (Pennsylvania politician) (1867–1926), US Representative from Pennsylvania
- Joseph R. McLaughlin (Michigan politician) (1851–1932), Lieutenant Governor of Michigan
- Joseph R. McLaughlin (North Carolina politician) (born 1954), US Airforce graduate and politician from North Carolina
- Joseph Frank McLaughlin, American judge in Hawaii
- Joseph McLaughlin (1922–1999), Irish tenor better known as Josef Locke
