= Mignon McLaughlin =

American journalist

- Born: 6 June 1913; Baltimore, Maryland, United States
- Died: 20 December 1983 (aged 70); Coral Gables, Florida, United States
- Occupations: Journalist, author
- Spouse: Robert E. McLaughlin

Mignon McLaughlin (6 June 1913 – 20 December 1983) was an American journalist and author.

== Biography ==
Mignon McLaughlin was born in Baltimore, Maryland, and grew up in New York City, where her mother, Joyce Neuhaus, was a prominent attorney. She graduated from Smith College in 1933 and returned to New York, embarking on a career as a journalist and a writer of short stories for Redbook, Cosmopolitan, and other women's magazines.

With her husband, Time editor Robert McLaughlin, she wrote the play Gayden, which had a limited run on Broadway during the 1949 season.

In the 1950s, she began publishing aphorisms that were later collected in three books: The Neurotic's Notebook, The Second Neurotic's Notebook, and The Complete Neurotic's Notebook. In his commentary on aphorisms, Melvin Maddocks notes the focus in McLaughlin's book on selections that speak in a personal voice.

She worked for Vogue in the 1940s, '50s and '60s and was copy editor and managing editor of Glamour in the 1960s and early 1970s.

She retired in 1973 and died in Coral Gables, Florida, on December 20, 1983.
