= Frank McLaughlin =

Frank McLaughlin may refer to:

- Frank McLaughlin (artist) (1935–2020), American comics artist
- Frank McLaughlin (baseball) (1856–1917), infielder for Major League Baseball
- Frank McLaughlin (sailor) (born 1960), Canadian sailor

== See also ==
- Frank McLoughlin (disambiguation)
