= Yanuca Lailai =

Island in Lomaiviti Islands, Fiji

Coordinates: 17°45′S 178°46.99′E

Geography
- Location: South Pacific Ocean
- Archipelago: Lomaiviti Islands
- Area: 0.29 km^{2} (0.11 sq mi)

Administration
- Fiji
- Division: Eastern Division
- Province: Lomaiviti
- District: Ovalau

Demographics
- Population: 0

Yanuca Lailai (also known as Lost Island to travellers) is a 72-acre (0.29 km^{2}), volcanic rock, limestone island located between the islands of Ovalau and Moturiki in Fiji. The coastline has mangrove trees, volcanic rock cliffs and beaches, and the interior abounds in jungle.

The island is uninhabited. The island was used as quarantine station when the first Indian indentured labourers arrived on the Leonidas.

== See also ==
- Desert island
- List of islands
