= David McLaughlin =

David McLaughlin may refer to:

- David McLaughlin (political figure), Canadian chief of staff to prime minister Brian Mulroney
- David T. McLaughlin (1932–2004), president of Dartmouth College
- David McLaughlin (basketball) (born 1974), head coach of the Dartmouth College's men's basketball team
- Dave McLaughlin, American writer, director and producer
- David McLaughlin (bluegrass) (born 1958), American multi-instrumentalist musician
- David W. McLaughlin (born 1944), American mathematician
