= William McLoughlin =

English footballer

Personal information
- Position(s): Wing half

Senior career*
Years	Team	Apps	(Gls)
1908–1910	Burnley	6	(0)
- *Club domestic league appearances and goals

William McLoughlin was a professional footballer who played as a wing half. He played six games in the Football League for Burnley.
