= Nuku District, Fiji =

District of Fiji

Coordinates: 18°14′S 178°00′E

Nuku District is a district in Fiji's Serua Province. Located on the southern coast of Viti Levu, the district had a population of 3,644 during the 2017 Fiji census.
