= Robert E. McLaughlin =

American journalist and writer (1908–1973)

Robert Emmet McLaughlin (September 21, 1908 – October 23, 1973) was an American journalist and writer. He was an editor at Time magazine for more than 20 years (1948–1969). He was the author of numerous short stories, three novels, and The Heartland, volume in the Time-Life Library of America series.

He was born in Chicago on September 21, 1908, the son of Ann Victoria (née O'Shea) and Frank McLaughlin. He attended the University of Colorado at Boulder, and went to New York City early in the 1930s, establishing himself as a well-published writer of short stories. He was the managing editor of McCall's magazine during the early 1940s until he was called to duty in the U.S. Army during World War II.

He came to prominence during WW-II with his short stories about army life in the New Yorker. A collection of the stories was published in 1945 as, A Short Wait Between Trains and other stories.

Following the war, he joined the staff of Time magazine as a contributing editor. He remained there for more than twenty years, working in 23 of the magazine's departments.

In addition to his short stories, he was the author of three novels, The Side of the Angels (1947), The Walls of Heaven (1951), and The Notion of Sin (1959).

With his wife, Mignon McLaughlin, he wrote a play Gayden, which had a limited run on Broadway in 1949. He retired from Time in 1968, when they moved to Florida. He died in Coral Gables, Florida on October 23, 1973.
