= Ross MacLachlan =

- Born: 1957 (age 67–68)
- Origin: Ontario, Canada
- Genres: Ragtime; boogie; stride
- Occupation: Pianist
- Instrument: Piano
- Website: www.notjustragtime.com

Ross MacLachlan (born 1957) is an accomplished pianist living in Eastern Ontario near Kingston. Specializing in ragtime, boogie and stride-piano styles, he has delighted live-music lovers with hundreds of performances while accompanied by other talented musicians including the likes of Gary Barratt, Patty Smith, Tim Roberts, Lynne Hanson, Nora Peterson and Spencer Evans.

He performed for Diana, Princess of Wales, on her visit to Kingston, Ontario in October 1991.

His music has been featured on several national radio broadcasts including the CBC Radio's The Vinyl Cafe with Stuart McLean.

== Discography ==
- Not Just Ragtime (Real Shiny Records, 2008)
