= Serua Province =

Province of Fiji

Coordinates: 18°10′S 178°00′E

- Province
- Interactive map of Serua Province
- Country: Fiji
- Division: Central Division

Area
  - Total: 830 km^{2} (320 sq mi)

Population (2017)
  - Total: 20,031
  - Density: 24/km^{2} (63/sq mi)

Serua is one of Fiji's fourteen provinces. Its 830 square kilometers occupy the southernmost areas of Viti Levu, being one of 8 provinces based on Fiji's largest island.

According to a report by David Wilkinson an interpreter and advisor to Sir Arthur Hamilton-Gordon, 1st Baron Stanmore, 1st, Governor of Fiji, the region was one of the least stable regions of Fiji before cession in 1874. It led to the secession of the western part of the province into the neighbouring province of Nadroga-Navosa in 1916.

Serua is part of the Burebasaga confederacy. The traditional head of the province is titled the Vunivalu of Korolevu and is based on the tiny island of Serua (to which the province is named after) just off the coast of the province.

The province is governed by a Provincial Council, chaired by Taito Nakalevu based in the nearest township of Navua.

Places of interest in the province include the Pacific Novitiate at Lomeri Pacific Harbour and Deuba beach.

== Demographics ==
It had a population of 15,461 at the 2007 census. Its population at the last census in 2017 was 20,010.

=== 2017 Census ===
Tikina (District)	Ethnicity						Total
Tikina (District)	iTaukei	%	Indo-Fijian	%	Other	%	Total
Nuku	3,310	90.8	199	5.5	135	3.7	3,644
Serua	9,903	60.5	5,423	33.1	1,040	6.4	16,366
Province	13,213	66.0	5,622	28.1	1,175	5.9	20,010

== Notable people ==
- Joe Cokanasiga, English national rugby union player
- Joketani Cokanasiga, politician
- Vilimaina Davu, Fijian and New Zealand netball player
- Kele Leawere, Fijian rugby union player
- Waisea Nayacalevu, Fijian rugby union player
- Pio Tabaiwalu, former Fijian diplomat and politician

== Sources ==
- Population Censuses and Surveys
