= Jimmy McLachlan =

Scottish footballer

Personal information
- Full name: James McLachlan
- Date of birth: 1870
- Place of birth: Glasgow, Scotland
- Position: Winger

Senior career*
Years	Team	Apps	(Gls)
- Vale of Leven
1890–1893	Derby County	55	(15)
1893–1894	Notts County	2	(0)
1894–1895	Derby County	8	(2)
- * Club domestic league appearances and goals

James McLachlan (1870 – unknown) was a Scottish footballer who played in the Football League for Derby County and Notts County.
