= James MacLachlan =

British flying ace (1919–1943)

James Archibald Findlay MacLachlan
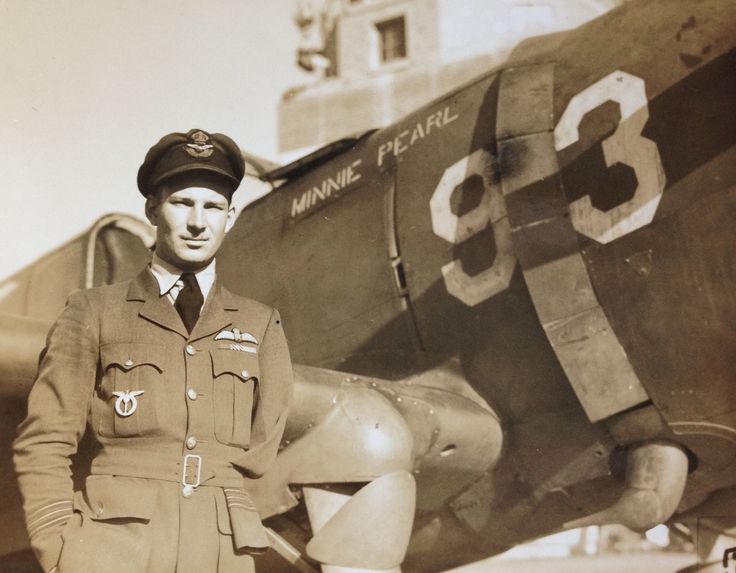
- MacLachlan in front of a P-36 Hawk during a visit to the United States, 1943
- Born: 1 April 1919; Styal, England
- Died: 31 July 1943 (aged 24); Pont-l'Évêque, German-occupied France
- Burial place: Pont-l'Évêque, Calvados, France
- Military career
- Allegiance: United Kingdom
- Branch: Royal Air Force
- Service years: 1937–1943
- Rank: Squadron leader
- Nickname: "One-Armed Mac"
- Commands: No. 1 Squadron RAF
- Conflicts: Second World War
- Awards: Distinguished Service Order; Distinguished Flying Cross & Two Bars; War Cross (Czechoslovakia)

James Archibald Findlay MacLachlan DSO, DFC & Two Bars (1 April 1919 – 31 July 1943) was a Royal Air Force (RAF) fighter pilot and flying ace of the Second World War. MacLachlan was credited with 16 German and Italian aircraft shot down in approximately 250 missions—7 were at night of which two were achieved over Malta in 1941 and 5 over France in 1942.

Born in Cheshire and one of four brothers educated at Monkton Combe School in Somerset, MacLachlan joined the RAF aged 17 in March 1937. He progressed quickly through flight training and was granted a commission as acting pilot officer on 3 May 1937. He completed his flight training in early 1939 and had considerable time to gain experience in operational types upon the outbreak of the Second World War. When the Battle of France began in May 1940 he was serving with No. 88 Squadron RAF flying the Fairey Battle light bomber he was credited with two enemy aircraft damaged and was awarded the Distinguished Flying Cross (DFC).

Surviving the battle he transferred to fighter pilot school in the summer 1940. During the Battle of Britain he served with No. 73 Squadron RAF and No. 145 Squadron RAF. He achieved a probable victory during the battle. In late 1940 he transferred to Malta in the Mediterranean Theatre of Operations and joined No. 261 Squadron RAF. By February 1941 he had achieved eight victories (two at night) and was awarded a Bar to his DFC. MacLachlan was wounded in action on 16 February 1941. His arm was so severely damaged it was amputated, but he returned to operations in November 1941 with an artificial limb.

MacLachlan joined No. 1 Squadron RAF as squadron leader and led night fighter operations in defence of Britain. In May 1942 he was awarded the Distinguished Service Order after claiming five more victories flying with Karel Kuttelwascher. Coupled with the two over Malta it qualified him as a night fighter ace. By July 1942 MacLachlan's tally stood at 13 enemy aircraft shot down including 7 at night. MacLachlan left the squadron for a position at the Air Fighting Development Unit (ADFU). In October 1942 MacLachlan departed to conduct lecturing tours to the United States. He returned to Britain with the ADFU in mid-1943. In June he joined No. 132 Squadron RAF on cross-Channel patrols over Europe. MacLachlan achieved his last 3 victories during these operations—all in one mission—to bring his final tally to 16.

On 18 July 1943 the P-51 Mustang in which he was flying was hit by German flak or suffered engine failure and crashed over France. The Germans reported him as a prisoner of war but he died in a military hospital from his injuries. MacLachlan was awarded a second Bar to his DFC on 30 July 1943 in absentia. During the course of his combat career he flew the Fairey Battle, Hawker Hurricane, Supermarine Spitfire and P-51 Mustang.

== Early life ==
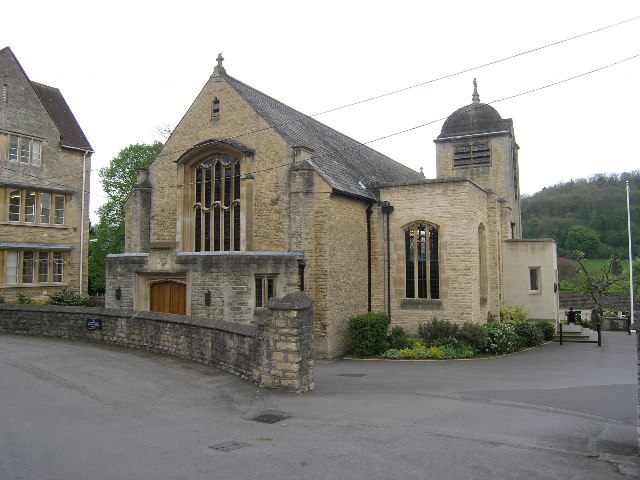
Monkton Combe School.

James MacLachlan was born on 1 April 1919 at Styal in Cheshire, the second of six children of Hugh MacLachlan and his wife Helen (née Orr-Ewing). The MacLachlans lived in the family home in Styal, where Hugh was employed as an oil and chemical manufacturer until his premature death in 1928 from peritonitis. Following their father's death the family moved to Southampton to be close to Helen's parents. Her father Archibald Orr-Ewing was connected with the Plymouth Brethren, China Inland Mission and the missionary field. His influence resulted in James being enrolled at King Edward's evangelical school for two years. After completing his preliminary education James became a boarder at Monkton Combe School near Bath, Somerset in September 1931, aged 12. James' brothers, Hugh Jnr, Gordon and Archie would later follow him through the same school.

MacLachlan was not academic although he did excel at poetry. He attracted trouble at school by writing scurrilous rhymes about his contemporaries and members of staff. He played rugby and enjoyed rowing but was not generally a sporting child. He enjoyed wildlife and animals. School encouraged in him a fascination with biology, and he regularly supplied rabbits and other specimens to the laboratory. He was not appointed a prefect and did not rise to a notable rank in the School Officer Training Corps. James preferred to engage in carpentry and metal work. He and his friends built and manufactured a .22 pistol in the workshops which they test-fired.

Keen to acquire a real firearm, he obtained a service revolver but shot himself in the hand. Eager for adventure, MacLachlan contemplated his future. At 17 he travelled to Scotland in May 1936 for a holiday near Comrie and Crieff. While there he went for a five-shilling flight at the RAF Leuchars open day which, according to his mother, made up his mind to become a pilot. He gained his School Leaving Certificate and entered the Royal Air Force (RAF) on a short service commission one month short of his 18th birthday in March 1937.

== Early RAF career ==
On 1 March 1937 he arrived at the No. 10 Elementary Training School and Reserve Flying Training Centre at RAF Yatesbury in Wiltshire. It was run by the British Aeroplane Company. He was assigned to B Flight. MacLachlan was uncomfortable with the military banter and the use of religious profanities. He also complained about the bills applicants were forced to pay. Mess bills were reportedly £ 2 10s per week and laundry 5s. Most of his salary was expended on these necessities.

MacLachlan was not given time to settle in. His first flight was in a Tiger Moth on 2 March 1937 in which he gained a 45-minute experience in an open-cockpit. He flew solo for the first time on 9 March after rapidly coming to grips with his trainer. He wrote, "You will be glad to hear I went solo today...Mr Sharp did a slow roll. It was pretty grim when we were upside down with nothing but 6,000 feet of air between us and the ground.....I simply love flying." MacLachlan was the youngest trainee of the group and after 23 solo and 28 hours dual flight he passed as an average grade pilot on 27 April. He had come second overall in his examinations. He travelled to RAF Uxbridge the following month. There, he was commissioned acting pilot officer service number 39639 on 18 May 1937. He was posted to No. 3 Flying Training School at Grantham in Lincolnshire. He flew the Hawker Hart and the Hawker Audax for the first time on 20 May 1938. He enjoyed the speed of the aircraft immensely and indulged in his passion for motor cars by buying an Austin 7 from a Nottingham dealership with his first pay cheque for £14 7s.

Despite getting lost on navigational exercises he passed as an "above average" pilot and his probation was passed. MacLachlan made his choice as to the type of squadron he wanted to fly with. He chose from a list of medium bomber or light bomber squadrons and proceeded to the No. 3 Advanced Flying Training School in Gloucestershire. At the school he practiced dive-bombing and level bombing attacks and exercised in close air support operations and rounded off his training at RAF Penrose near, Pwllheli North Wales at the No. 5 Armament Training Camp. On 26 November 1937 MacLachlan once again passed as an "above average" pilot. He was promptly posted to No. 88 Squadron RAF at RAF Boscombe Down. MacLachlan's logbook read 92 hours flying to his credit.

MacLachlan did not like the bomber training. In a letter to his mother he described his grievances, "We have started bombing today. It's awful! You have to lie on your belly and look through the trapdoor in the bottom of the plane [Hawker Hart]. All the hot oily air from the radiator blows straight into your face. It makes me feel quite sick!". He was enthusiastic about describing the mathematical problems associated with aerial bombing and the use of cameras to judge accuracy rather than using live-munitions, but MacLachlan was more enamored with air-to-air gunnery. He wrote of his training, "I have been doing air-to-air gunnery with the front guns today. It is super!" Live ammunition was used at the end of the training. MacLachlan was permitted to train using 16 bombs, which cost £1 1s each.

Number 88 Squadron was a new unit and part of the expansion schemes of the late 1930s designed to increase the number of aircraft in response to the threat of the German Luftwaffe. He joined the squadron on 6 December 1937 and it was re-equipped with the Fairey Battle. He flew the aircraft for the first time on 30 December. On 1 March 1938 his commission as pilot officer was confirmed and in May 1938 he joined the No. 7 Armament Training Station in Northumberland to engage in formation flying, aerial gunnery and bombing practice. It also practiced mock attacks on the British Army 2nd Infantry Division. By the time war broke out in September 1939, MacLachlan had two years of experience of flying the machine.

== Second World War ==
On 1 September 1939, Germany invaded Poland. MacLachlan's squadron moved to France on 2 September, and Britain and her allies declared war the following day. 88 Squadron formed part of the RAF Advanced Air Striking Force (AASF) commanded by Air Vice-Marshal Patrick Playfair. On 12 September 1939 88 Squadron was based southeast of Rheims. At this time the Luftwaffe was heavily engaged in Poland and only a few small-scale skirmishes were fought with a thin German fighter screen left to guard western Germany against a French attack. On 20 September elements of the squadron were intercepted by Messerschmitt Bf 109 fighters from Jagdgeschwader 26 (Fighter Wing 26) over the border. Four Fairey Battle aircraft were shot down. On 30 September 150 Squadron lost five Battles on unescorted missions into German airspace. It quickly became clear to the crews that the Battle was too slow and too poorly armed to defend itself and operations were shut down. The squadron took measures to increase its defensive power by adding a third machine gun in the back of the cockpit for the observer to use.

On 26 October MacLachlan was promoted to flying officer, and undertook an attack mission. During the course of the flight his wingtip made contact with the ground but he was able to return to base. The squadron settled down into winter quarters until March when they were reassigned to the French border region with Spain. On 1 April he celebrated his 21st birthday and took the opportunity of driving from Perpignan across the frontier into the Pyrenees to celebrate it. On 9 April the squadron was put on alert when the Germans invaded Denmark and Norway and the squadron were soon relocated to northern France at Mourmelon. On 10 May the Phoney War came to a close with the German invasion of Western Europe.

=== Battle of France ===
The Squadron did not see action in the Battle of France on the first day of the campaign—10 May—but many other Battle squadrons did and suffered high losses attacking German ground forces. The squadron's airfield came under air attack from the first day. Junkers Ju 88s destroyed hangars and two aircraft in a night attack. On 11 May it was bombed again and three of four aircraft were lost attacking German Army columns in daylight hours. On 14 May MacLachlan flew his first sortie over the Sedan bridgeheads. The German thrust at Sedan threatened to outflank the Maginot Line in the south and the Allied Armies in the north by breaking through in the centre and advancing to the English Channel. On 12 May Sedan fell. Heinz Guderian's XIX Panzer Corps and Georg-Hans Reinhardt's XXXXI Panzer Corps were breaking through onto the west bank on 14 May. Desperate to halt the attacks, General Marcel Têtu, commander of the Allied Tactical Air Forces in consultation with Air Vice-Marshal Playfair, commander of the AASF, ordered all available units to attack. No. 88 Squadron was committed to the air offensive. Six aircraft attacked armoured column positions, four attacked bridges. One aircraft was lost. Despite heavy anti-aircraft fire and German fighter opposition MacLachlan attacked and got away at low altitude. Allied units suffered 50 percent losses that day. On 15 May the airfield was hit twice again and the squadron moved back near Troyes.

On 19 May the squadron flew night operations owing to German air superiority. MacLachlan flew a raid against Givet, on the French-Belgian border; his only action in support of Allied forces in the Battle of Belgium. He was ordered to fly daylight missions on 21 May near the Somme where German Panzer units were seen to be moving. The squadron claimed one German tank destroyed. His low-level flying did not impress his observer, Sergeant Hardy, who said to a member of the squadron: "I don't want to be killed by that f*****g MacLachlan – he does not care for his crew. I'm going to the C.O and ask to be recrewed"—the commanding officer approved his request. On his next mission Hardy was shot down and killed in action with his new pilot. MacLachlan then took a new gunner, Les Davies, who later flew night fighters.

MacLachlan flew missions against rail targets in Nazi Germany on 23 May, attacking Bingen am Rhein. On 25 May he flew against targets near Sedan and his Battle was damaged by flak. The unit relocated to Moissy and he flew missions in support of French Army forces around Abbeville. On 10 June near Fleury, his cockpit hood was shot away by accurate ground fire but MacLachlan was unhurt. On 13 June he flew a daylight mission against German spearheads and while returning to base flew under a formation of Junkers Ju 87 dive bombers. The escorting Bf 109s gave chase and shot one Battle down. MacLachlan claimed to have managed to fire on two Bf 109s and damaged them—these claims cannot be confirmed.

One last raid was carried out on 14 June—the day Paris fell—and the squadron abandoned France as Allied resistance crumbled. They landed at Houssay airfield. They then took off for RAF Driffield in Yorkshire. As they crossed over England MacLachlan took a detour to do a low fly-past over his old school at Monkton Combe near Bath. The stunt was witnessed by his brother who was attending the institution at the time. 88 Squadron relocated to Belfast, Northern Ireland on 23 June for rest and refitting. Following intensive operations during the Battle of France MacLachlan was awarded the Distinguished Flying Cross (DFC) (gazetted 16 July 1940).

=== Battle of Britain to Malta ===
MacLachlan did not take to his new posting and was eager to get back to the action. MacLachlan volunteered for service with RAF Fighter Command during the Battle of Britain which had begun in July 1940. He learned on 18 August that he had been one of five pilots chosen from 88 Squadron to retrain as fighter pilots. He was posted to RAF Drem for training with No. 145 Squadron. He flew a Hawker Hurricane fighter for the first time days later on 22 August. Within nine days he had logged 18 hours in the type. On 3 September he was given official leave to travel to London. There he received his DFC at Buckingham Palace. He returned to No. 145 shortly afterwards and was based at RAF Tangmere, Croydon and Westhampnett. No. 11 Group RAF was in the thick of the fighting and suffered many casualties. MacLachlan and his group were to replace the many pilots killed or wounded. MacLachlan practiced operational take-offs, fighter tactics, radio control, break-aways and dogfights—the essence of air-to-air combat. He was sent on patrols on 30 August, but only over Scotland, to guard against attacks from Luftflotte 5 (Air Fleet 5) based in Norway. No interceptions were made as air combat was rare in the north. On 21 September MacLachlan survived a force-landing at Dyce, caused by an oil leak. On 27 September 1940 MacLachlan was posted to the south at Debden, arriving two days later. He was then assigned to No. 73 Squadron RAF at RAF Castle Camps.

On 30 September MacLachlan flew in defence of London as a large raid sought to attack the city. The RAF fighters performed well but 73 Squadron did not encounter the enemy. As September ended the Luftwaffe began sending fighter-bombers (Jabos)—bomb carrying Bf 109s—over England. The following day MacLachlan was promoted to flight lieutenant in view of his experience. On 7 October he intercepted one such raid and engaged in air-to-air combat for the first time as a fighter pilot. At 09:50 the unit was scrambled to defend Chelmsford. Flying with No. 257 Squadron they overflew the Thames Estuary. No contact was made. At 12:30 they were scrambled again. This time MacLachlan spotted two Bf 109s at 20,000 feet. Six more attacked the squadron and MacLachlan managed to fire a burst which hit one and it dove away emitting smoke and gained a probable victory. On 12 October 1940 MacLachlan pursued a Heinkel He 111 over Castle Camps but could not catch the enemy machine which was too far away at high altitude. It proved to be his last encounter with the enemy during the Battle of Britain.

Two weeks later MacLachlan learned he was to be relocated to Malta. Twelve pilots and 207 men boarded HMS Argus in the River Clyde just off Greenock on 7 November 1940 and set sail for the Mediterranean Theatre of Operations. The convoy sent to Malta constituted a part of Operation Collar. The operation was to supply aircraft for the Island's defence. In June 1940 Italy had declared war on France when the country was on the verge of collapse at the hands of the German Wehrmacht. The Italians hoped they could take advantage of the weakened Allies by joining the Axis powers. It was the Italian intent to launch a series of air, naval and land offensives throughout the Mediterranean and in particularly in North Africa. Malta lay across Italian sea communications between Sicily and Italian-held Libya. The island had the potential to be a useful base from which the British could disrupt Axis supplies to and from North Africa and the ensuing North African Campaign. The Regia Aeronautica (Italian Air Force) resolved to eliminate the island by bombing shipping bringing in supplies and attacking the island directly. With air power crucial to both sides, the island was reinforced.

MacLachlan found himself at the heart of the battle for the island before the squadron arrived. On 27 November the convoy came under attack from the Italian Navy in the Battle of Cape Spartivento. MacLachlan saw the Italian fleet at a distance and witnessed enemy shells splashing around the ship. He also witnessed an attack by Italian Savoia-Marchetti SM.79 bombers but they failed to damage the ships. Most of the Hurricanes that took off from the Argus fell into the water out of fuel. The pilots had not run the Hurricanes at economic speeds for fuel consumption.

Serving on Malta with No. 261 Squadron at RAF Ta' Qali, MacLachlan soon got bored, with little to do and no aircraft to fly. He was granted a trip to Tangiers in Spanish Morocco for Christmas and New Year's leave. While there he was arrested by the authorities for taking pictures near a Spanish Navy facility and released a short time later. He travelled to Gibraltar where he wangled trips on flying boats from No. 202 Squadron RAF which was monitoring German and Vichy French shipping sailing between eastern Spanish ports and Italy. MacLachlan returned to Malta on a Short Sunderland on 5 January 1941.

=== Over Malta ===
A new convoy, codenamed Operation Excess was on its way through Malta with ammunition supplies. Excess coincided with the arrival of the Luftwaffe Fliegerkorps X (10th Air Corps) in Sicily to support the faltering Italians in the theatre, after the failed invasion of Egypt. On 9 January the Regia Aeronautica flew a fighter sweep over the Grand Harbour. Eighteen Macchi C.200s from 6° Gruppo were engaged in aerial combat. MacLachlan climbed to 22,000 feet and spotted the enemy fighters 10,000 below. He attacked a group of six and shot one down into the sea where it left a large plume of water. MacLachlan circled the sea and noticed the Italian pilot had escaped his aircraft and survived. Capitano Luigi Armanino was taken aboard a rescue craft to a prisoner of war camp in Malta, wounded in the thigh and arm. MacLachlan claimed a second Macchi shot down minutes later. The following day he attacked an Italian Fiat CR.42 over the Excess convoy as the Italians attacked the ships once more. Four others appeared and they climbed over him and dropped onto his tail. Not risking a five to one encounter, MacLachlan flew over the Excess convoy hoping the ship's fire would protect him The British vessels fired at him in error but his aircraft was not hit.

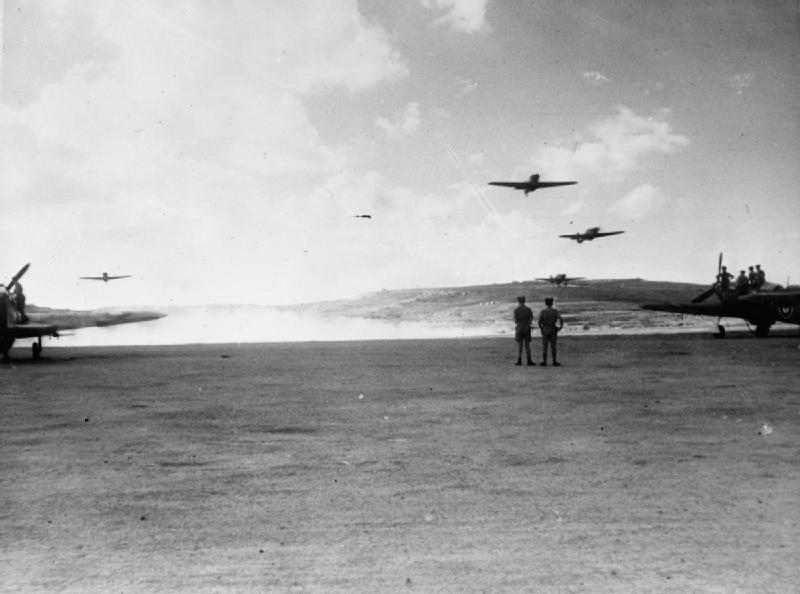
261 squadron scrambling from Ta Kali, 1941.

By 10 January HMS Illustrious had docked in Malta. The Luftwaffe attacked the ship again and scored six damaging hits. MacLachlan's squadron failed to intercept the Ju 87 dive bombers that morning. On 16 January he witnessed several formations of Ju 87s and Junkers Ju 88s attack the ship. Unable to stand the sight, he raced with a fellow pilot to a dispersal strip and asked to take-off only to be refused permission. Three days later, MacLachlan was in action against two German units: Sturzkampfgeschwader 2 (StG 2—Dive Bomber Wing 2) and Sturzkampfgeschwader 1 (StG 1—Dive Bomber Wing 1). He attacked one Ju 87 killing the gunner before dispatching it into the sea. Returning to base he spotted a Ju 87 that had double-backed, hoping to slip past the defences to attack the aircraft carrier. MacLachlan destroyed the aircraft (3–4 victories) and then had to take evasive action when attacked by an Italian CR.42. He shot the Italian fighter down: Sergente Maggiore Iacone from 70a Squadriglia bailed out was taken prisoner. He passed single CR.42s and Ju 87s flying low and unaware of his presence but his ammunition was exhausted. During the course of the mission his fifth victory made him a fighter ace. RAF fighters claimed six Ju 87s shot down during the air battle and three can be confirmed. Oberfeldwebel Kurt Zube and his gunner was killed as was Unteroffizier Rudolf Vater—both served in I./StG 1. Obergefreiter Hans Küsters of II./StG 2 was also killed. A further I./StG 1 Ju 87 returned badly damaged with a dead gunner.

Frustrated at exhausting his ammunition he landed. After the Hurricanes had been refuelled he was scrambled again to intercept an enemy formation. MacLachlan stumbled across a Cant Z.506-B bomber of 612 Squadriglia during the sortie which he destroyed. The pilot, Sottotenente Ignazio Rossi was killed in action. After landing, yet another raid came in. MacLachlan climbed and singled out a Junkers Ju 88 of 8./Lehrgeschwader 1 (LG 1—Learning Wing 1). The Ju 88 saw him coming and swung around to a head-on position. After a brief turning duel MacLachlan hit the port engine and it crashed into the bay near Zonkor Point. For his actions he was awarded a bar to his DFC on 24 January.

On 9 February he claimed a night victory—a Ju 88 which vanished. MacLachlan claimed it destroyed. The Malta Y Service was combing the air waves and picked up the German crew's desperate distress calls. The aircraft was actually a He 111 from 5./Kampfgeschwader 26 (KG 26—Bomber Wing 26). All the crew survived though one was wounded. Within half an hour he was in the air again. He engaged a Ju 88 from II./LG 1 and claimed it shot down. In fact the Ju 88 managed to reach Catania, Sicily where it was written off in a crash-landing.

Over the next few days morale began to sink when Bf 109s from 7./JG 26, led by Oberleutnant Joachim Müncheberg appeared over Malta and immediately took a toll of Hurricanes. The British fighter could not match the performance of the Bf 109. MacLachlan took a flight of them by surprise on 11 February but the German pilots spotted them in time, climbed and dived. According to MacLachlan they "left us standing"—in his diary he noted the poor morale of the squadron owing to the success of the Bf 109s and he recorded the desperation of pilots eager to shoot one down. On 16 February 1941 MacLachlan's Hurricane Mk. Ia (V7731) was again in battle with the Luftwaffe. In the morning his squadron engaged Bf 109s over Malta. After careful manoeuvering he managed to get onto the tail of a Bf 109 but neglected to check his own six o'clock position. He was hit by cannon fire which shattered his engine and cockpit. His left arm began bleeding profusely and ceased to function. He managed to remove his helmet and radio equipment and slide back the canopy and jump out. MacLachlan gave up trying to reach for his ripcord, assuming it must have been shot off. Later, MacLachlan said he had almost given up altogether when the thought of his mother reading the telegram informing her he had been killed in action spurred him on to try once again. He struggled and found the ripcord and deployed his parachute. Exhausted, he landed in a garden and lay there before being recovered.

Scarcely had I got myself fairly comfortable and closed my eyes, when I heard the sound of people running. I hurriedly tried to think up some famous last words to give my public, but never had a chance to utter them. I was surrounded by a crowd of shouting gesticulating Maltese, who pulled at my parachute, lifted my head and drove me so furious that I had to give up the dying idea in order to concentrate completely on kicking every Maltese who came within range. From what the pongos told me after, I believe I registered some rather effective shots

— MacLachlan, after being shot down on 9 February 1941.

MacLachlan probably was hit by a Bf 109 flown by Müncheberg himself—the German fighter leader had reported his 26th victory as a Hurricane with the pilot bailing out. He was the only British pilot to bail out in the battle. The Hurricane crashed near Addolorata Cemetery near Paola. MacLachlan remained in hospital with a severely wounded left arm. He was pumped with saline solution to prevent blood clotting but his arm was too badly damaged and it was amputated below the elbow. His determination and reputation was as such, the nurses and squadron were already taking bets on whether or not he would return to action within a fortnight on the day of the operation. While in hospital he began speaking with Luigi Armanino, the pilot he had shot down days earlier. Among the topics of discussion were strengths of the Italian aircraft and Armanino's exploits piloting CR.42s during the Spanish Civil War.

MacLachlan stayed on Malta and took a flight in a transport aircraft on 6 March, winning the shilling bet. He embarked in HMS Defender on 22 March to return to Britain. He toured Egypt and then took a detour to Athens, Greece. The Axis had invaded Greece and Yugoslavia on 6 April and the Battle of Greece was on the verge of an out come within two weeks and MacLachlan was evacuated back to Egypt. He flew down the Nile River into Sudan and Kenya in a captured German Junkers Ju 52 and piloted the aircraft himself on 24 April. Stopping at various airfields he flew when he could. On one such occasion he flew a North American T-6 Texan in an aerobatic sortie. He reached South Africa on 10 May. He flew home on a Boeing 314 Clipper via Lagos, Bathurst in Gambia, Lisbon, Portugal, Dublin, Ireland arriving in Bristol on 7 August.

=== Night fighter ===
MacLachlan reported to No. 1 Depot, RAF Uxbridge and two days later attended No. 2 Central Medical Board on 13 August. He was certified fit to fly and flew Supermarine Spitfire on 21 August. He moved to Bournemouth to see his brother Gordon who was now a pilot officer in No. 501 Squadron RAF. At Queen Mary's Hospital he was fitted with a new arm. MacLachlan explained to the doctors that he required an arm that would allow him to fly a Hurricane. They designed a limb that allowed him to operate the throttle while taking the control column and firing button with his right hand. They spent hours studying the cockpit layout. The medical staff produced an arm with four spring-loaded pins, like fingers, which enabled him to use the controls on the port side of the cockpit. They secured his left arm to the levers of the throttle quadrant: throttle, propeller pitch control, supercharger and mixture control. The landing gear controls were located on the right side. The artificial arm had to interact with the control column while the gear was being retracted or lowered. His new arm proved sufficient and in September 1941 he flew as many hours in Hurricanes as possible, though not without incident. On 7 September 1941 he force-landed in darkness during a searchlight co-operation exercise. On 28 September 1941 he nearly collided with a Bristol Blenheim in low-cloud. Nevertheless, he was cleared for operational flying on 15 October.

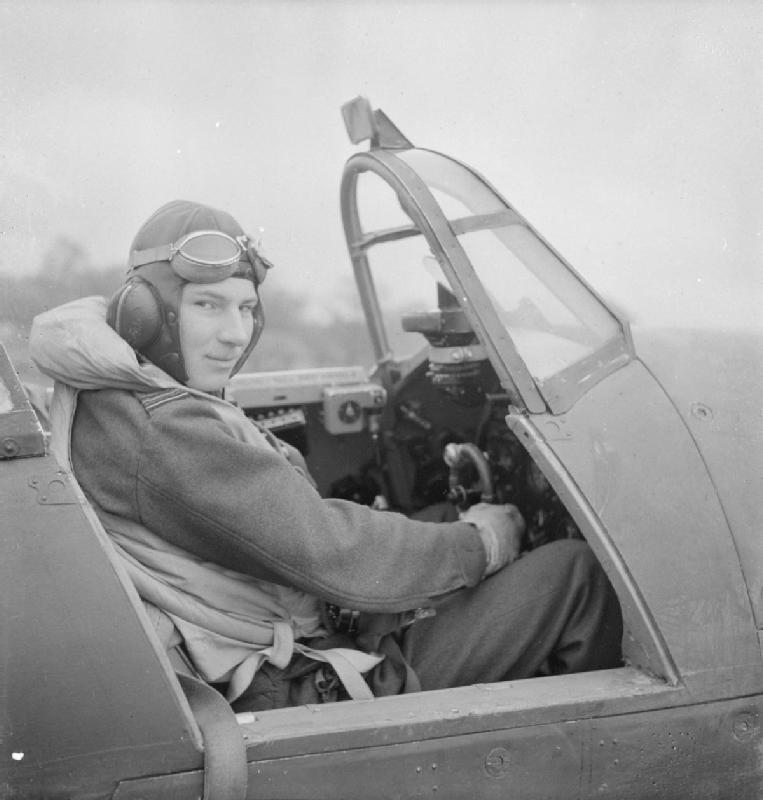
MacLachlan, in the cockpit of his Hurricane IIC at Tangmere, 20 November 1941

On 3 November 1941 MacLachlan was promoted to squadron leader, and was given command of No. 1 Squadron at Redhill Aerodrome, equipped with the Hawker Hurricane Mk. IIc for night intruder operations over western Europe. MacLachlan was assigned his personal aircraft, Hurricane BD983/JX-Q. He painted an emblem showing a left arm with a cannon shell passing through it and the fingers giving the V sign. The squadron spent the winter, 1941–2 in intensive night fighter training with searchlight and ground control station. In February 1942 he attended the Searchlight School at Shrivenham. In his absence he missed the Channel Dash and subsequent air battle during which the squadron lost two pilots. The squadron scored its first success on 1 April—his 23rd birthday—when Karel Kuttelwascher—with whom he often flew—destroyed two Ju 88s. MacLachlan found locating German aircraft in the dark difficult, though he himself claimed a locomotive damaged on the night and left two of its wagons destroyed.

In 1942 the Baedeker Raids were in operation against British cities in retaliation for RAF Bomber Commands attacks on Germany. The Luftwaffe was stepping up its campaign although it was fully engaged on the Eastern Front. On 18 April Do 217s raided Portsmouth in retaliation for an attack on Lübeck on 28/29 March. An attack on Rostock resulted in retaliation with raids on Bath, Exeter, Canterbury, Norwich and York. On the night of 26–27 April 1942 the Luftwaffe attacked Bath. MacLachlan took off in the evening of 26 April and headed for airfields around Evreux and Dreux. He claimed a I./Kampfgeschwader 2 (KG 2—Bomber Wing 2) Dornier Do 217 destroyed which came down near Evreux severely damaged. A second was damaged but his port cannon jammed preventing its destruction. Air Vice Marshal Trafford Leigh-Mallory sent his congratulations and his exploits were printed in The Times newspaper. On 30 April MacLachlan and Kuttelwascher set out again with a 25-minute interval between both. Kuttelwascher claimed a Do 217 and He 111, but MacLachlan settled for the destruction of two locomotives between Le Havre and Rouen. He also damaged a tug boat on the Seine and destroyed another locomotive near Yvetot. These successes were achieved in two missions on the same night.

Certainly the average intruder pilot is not the cat-eyed, carrot-eating killer that the press sometimes makes him out to be. Most of us night fighters are too fond of our mornings in bed to go flying around in daytime. Give me a moonlit night and my old Hurricane and you can have your Spitfires and dawn readiness. We've no formation flying to worry about, and no bombers to escort. In fact, nothing to do but amuse ourselves once we've crossed the French coast.

— James MacLachlan to the BBC on 18 May 1942.

On 4/5 May the Luftwaffe hit Exeter severely. That night MacLachlan claimed destroyed two He 111s of Küstenfliegergruppe 506. He trailed the German bombers back to France and attacked them where they believed they were safe. In fact both of his victims were Ju 88s which crashed near Dinard. From Feldwebel Robert Bogel's Wrk Nr. 1528, only the gunner was able to bail out, while observer Leutnant zur See (naval rank) Roman Wallner and Obergefreiter Johan Beibl were killed. There was only one survivor from Unteroffizier Josef Palmer's Ju 88 D-4 Wrk Nr. 1154; Unteroffizier Karl Schorn managed to bail out but Leutnant zur See Ernst Tramp and Richard Staub were killed.

On 16 May MacLachlan was informed that he would be decorated with the Distinguished Service Order (DSO). On 29 May the award was announced. His tally stood at 11 air victories and he was becoming a recognised night flyer and ground-attack ace. On 18 May 1942 the BBC interviewed him for the 9 pm news. During the interview he gave his views on the dangers and thrills of night fighter operations.

On 3/4 June 1942 MacLachlan infiltrated a group of Do 217s from KG 2 as they orbited in preparation for landing at Saint-André-sur-Orne. Within 14 seconds he had shot down two bombers and damaged two more (victories 12–13) before German defences were alerted and began returning fire. Flying with Kuttelwascher, they trailed a formation of 15 German bombers that had raided Poole. Sighting them over their own airfield he destroyed one and then was detected by searchlights. Taking evasive action he latched onto another and shot it down. A third and fourth were damaged. Kuttelwascher arrived and as MacLachlan left and claimed another He 111 and Do 217. MacLachlan saw two flashes on the ground denoting a crashed aircraft after he attacked. German records show two Do 217s shot down one crash-landed and one severely damaged. MacLachlan's first victim appears to have been Unteroffizier Gerhard Wagner's Wrk Nr. 5392 Do 217 from 3./KG 2. Wagner, Feldwebel Wilhelm Oberwohr, Unteroffizier Josef Maier and Oberfledwebel Anton Lamm were killed. Another II./KG 2 Do 217 crashed there while another was severely damaged. Another Do 217 fell 40 miles south of Cherbourg but this machine—Wrk nr. 5331 piloted by Feldwebel Hans Koch of 7./KG 2—was likely a victim of Kuttelwascher. All of the crew were killed in action. It was MacLachlan's last victory with the squadron. He flew five more intruder sorties during which he returned via Antwerp and Ostend at near-zero feet after his map had blown out the side-canopy window on 26 June and chased a Ju 88 45 miles south of Selsey Bill without result on 2 July.

The Daily Express hailed their success with two articles, "The Killers Who Stalk By Night". Needing a rest, the squadron was withdrawn to Yorkshire. On 31 July MacLachlan was posted to 59 Operational Training Unit (OTU) as an instructor. While there he and Kuttelwascher were decorated with the Czechoslovak War Cross by the exiled President of Czechoslovakia Edvard Beneš on 11 August 1942. Before he left, MacLachlan had the opportunity to fly the Hawker Typhoon which was to replace 1 Squadron's ageing Hurricanes.

=== American tour ===
While based at Crosby-on-Eden with 59 OTU MacLachlan spent time flying other types of aircraft including the Bristol Beaufighter. On 20 August 1942 he was posted to the Air Fighting Development Unit at RAF Duxford for a short time. MacLachlan flew as often as he could regardless of the activity. He flew as a co-pilot in a Short Stirling heavy bomber and practiced fighter evasion techniques and then proceeded to fly 15 types of aircraft in 11 days. MacLachlan also flew Supermarine Spitfires, acting as an attacking fighter as well as the American-made Bell P-39 Airacobra. MacLachlan also flew with the No. 1426 Flight RAF which operated captured German aircraft. He flew a Ju 88, M2+MK formerly of Küsten Flieger Gruppe 106 which force-landed at RAF Chivenor in November 1941. Hew flew in a passenger on Heinkel He 111 (AW177) 1H+EN of 5./KG 26 which force-landed in Scotland in February 1940. At this time he provided escort to the resident Messerschmitt Bf 110 at the unit as it moved around airfields, although it is unknown if he flew it. By 4 October 1942 he had received notice that he had been selected as an RAF representative to tour the United States lecturing British and American trainees in United States Army Air Force facilities. MacLachlan left 59 OTU with immediate effect.

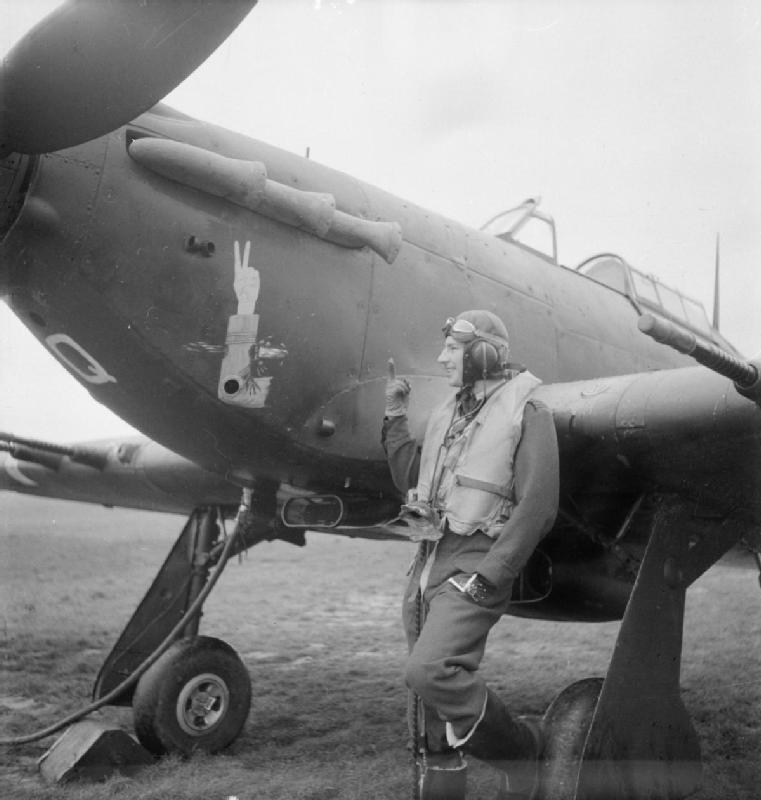
MacLachlan and his Hurricane, decorated with a V sign.

MacLachlan departed Liverpool for Canada aboard the RMS Queen Elizabeth in a heavily guarded convoy and arrived in Halifax, Nova Scotia on 17 October 1942. He travelled to Montreal on 24 October where he was met by reporters and photographers to publicise the event before moving to New York City that night. From New York he went to Washington, D.C., on 28 October where he received orders from the RAF delegation. MacLachlan was to teach British officer cadets in American flying schools RAF General Service Regulations to prepare them for when they entered an OTU in Britain. Maxwell Air Force Base in Montgomery, Alabama was designated as his headquarters but MacLachlan was based at Eglin Air Force Base initially. His post necessitated trips to the Craig Air Force Base near Selma, Alabama.

MacLachlan travelled to flight schools across America. In November he flew to Orlando, Florida, and across to Galveston, Texas near Palm Beach. The lecturing tour took him to Los Angeles, California at the end of 1942. By January 1943 he had also visited Arizona and Texas. His flight log had expanded throughout this period to include a variety of types. Using his privileged position he flew the Curtiss P-40 Warhawk, Lockheed P-38 Lightning and Republic P-47 Thunderbolt. Through flying MacLachlan felt the urge to participate in combat operations again but he enjoyed American hospitality immensely. In February he flew at an aerobatic show in Mesa, Arizona. On 18 February 1943 MacLachlan had a close call. While flying from Fort Stockton to El Paso, he force-landed in the desert when he ran out of fuel. According to a legend, MacLachlan used a local pipeline to fill the tanks. While in America he undertook several public relations tours and met movie stars such as Orson Welles and Joan Fontaine when he visited Hollywood for autographed photo-shoots.

On 6 March 1943 MacLachlan began the journey back to Britain. He flew to Canada in a Lockheed Model 18 Lodestar where he spent eight days with the RAF Ferry Command in Montreal flying B-25 Mitchells. MacLachlan flew one of these aircraft under a railway bridge in Quebec. From Canada he flew to Bluie West, Greenland then to Reykjavík, Iceland. MacLachlan reached Prestwick on 3 April 1943. MacLachlan visited his comrades in 1 Squadron based nearby at Ibsley before moving on to Hunsdon to see night fighter officer John Cunningham. MacLachlan may have wanted another squadron command but on 15 April 1943 MacLachlan was sent back to the Air Fighting Development Unit at RAF Wittering.

MacLachlan's stay was unhappy. On 19 April 1943 he received news that his brother Gordon MacLachlan had been shot down over Brest, France while escorting B-24 bombers. They were intercepted by Focke-Wulf Fw 190s belonging to 1./Jagdgeschwader 2. Unteroffizier Erich Henning and Hauptmann Jürgen Heppe each claimed a Spitfire. 616 Squadron lost Gordon and Squadron leader Pip Lefevre. Lefevre survived and evaded capture, returning to Britain via Gibraltar. Gordon was killed and the Germans recovered the body and buried him at Plouguerneau. MacLachlan was bitter at the loss of his brother and was keen to get back into action against the enemy.

== Channel front and death ==
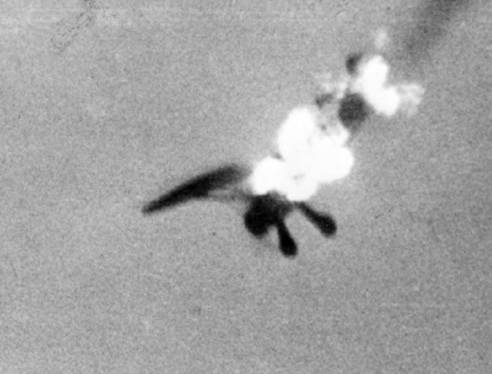
One of MacLachlan's victories recorded on his gun camera, 29 June 1943.

MacLachlan rejoined the AFDU at Wittering on 15 April 1943. On 16 April 1943 his brother Gordon was shot down and killed flying a Spitfire in a raid on Brest. On 19 April James began trials in the P-51 Mustang (termed Mustang IA by the RAF). He selected FD442 which became his personal mount. The P-51, was at that time, powered by an Allison V-1710 and armed with two 20 mm cannon in each wing. MacLachlan also flew Mustangs powered by the Rolls-Royce Merlin engine which proved so successful in later variants which flew and fought in the USAAF. MacLachlan visited his old school at Monkton on 29 May 1943 which had pledged £1,000 for the five needed to buy a Spitfire as part of a local Wings for Victory Week.

MacLachlan was not content in his position and pestered his superiors for an operational posting after weeks of practicing air combat with RAF Army Cooperation Command. Reluctantly, AOC Fighter Command Trafford Leigh-Mallory gave him permission to carry out Ranger operations over occupied France. Since his return MacLachlan had been devising tactics for long-range penetrations into enemy airspace, where Allied fighter aircraft had not operated before in daylight. He proposed to get through the Luftwaffe defence belt at low-altitude and consequently trained in low-level navigation by spending hours flying around England at tree-top height. With this in mind, he flew a sortie on 8 June 1943. The poor weather combined with the sighting of two Fw 190s near Le Tréport forced him to turn for home. The rear-ward vision of the P-51B (or IA as the British referred to it), was limited. Flying alone where enemy aircraft could approach unseen was courting disaster and MacLachlan decided he needed assistance.

Flight Lieutenant Geoffrey Page had just arrived at the ADFU. He had been a fighter pilot but was shot down and badly burned on 12 August 1940 during the Battle of Britain. Page was also keen on vengeance and approached MacLachlan in the Mess and proposed a two-fighter patrol. He said that he wanted one German fighter for each of the 15 operations he had endured since 1940. The two pilots began to practice together in two Mustangs. The operation required little wind, so it would not interfere with navigation and a low cloud base to allow the two to spot enemy aircraft silhouette against it at even great distances. Hawker Typhoons from MacLachlann's former 1 Squadron to carry out diversion attacks against shipping off Boulogne. The operation was flown on 29 June 1943. At 08:55 they took off from RAF Lympne. Page later recalled, "Fine bloody pair we are, going off to tackle the enemy with only one good hand between us!"

As the two P-51s crossed over the Seine and reached Rambouillet, they sighted a formation of enemy aircraft. Brief bursts of machine gun fire dispatched four Focke-Wulf Fw 56 trainers—two falling to MacLachlan. Their victims were from JG 105. Gefreiter Walter Seigler was killed in Wrk. Nr. 1868 and Kurt Prager died in Wrk Nr. 2438. Gefreiter Alois Erdl was wounded and the aircraft written off and the fourth was able to force-land safely, damaged. Gefreiter Gotze-Gerd Kuhn was unhurt. They continued their hunt and flying near Bretigny spotted two Ju 88 night fighters or bombers coming into land. MacLachlan destroyed the first and shared the second with Page. Both aircraft belonged to IV./Kampfgeschwader 6 (KG 6—Bomber Wing 6). The pilots—Gefreiter Gerhard Zimmermann and Unteroffizier Karl Brocks—were killed. The Mustangs retreated when the airfield defences retaliated with gunfire. MacLachlan and Page returned at 1,000 feet and crossed the coast south-west of Dieppe and crossed between Brighton and Newhaven upon their return. MacLachlan was awarded a second Bar to his DFC while Page received the DFC.

Page and MacLachlan flew to No. 96 Squadron RAF which was then flying de Havilland Mosquito night fighters. He requested his old gunner, Les Davies, who now piloted Mosquitos to join them. Davies accepted but MacLachlan was killed before he could take up the offer. MacLachlan and Page flew to Tangmere on 15 July. On his next mission on 18 July 1943 MacLachlan's Mustang FD442 was probably hit by ground fire when crossing the French coast near Dieppe. Page noticed MacLachlan's Mustang suddenly pull up sharply from their tree-top height by about 1,000 feet. He saw MacLachlan pull back the canopy but apparently changed his mind about bailing out as the aircraft leveled out and descended. The Mustang then headed towards a small field. MacLachlan touched down three-quarters the way across and the Mustang ploughed into an orchard at the field's edge which ripped off the wings. Page orbited the crash site several times and considered landing to rescue him but the space was too confined. Page dived at the wreck and took gun-camera footage but could see no signs of life and then headed home. The Operations Record was unable to determine the cause of the crash. MacLachlan made no radio broadcast. It was possibly the result of enemy small-arms fire or mechanical failure. On 30 July MacLachlan was awarded a second Bar to his DFC.

MacLachlan was critically injured. The Germans took him prisoner, and treated him for a fractured skull at Field Hospital 711 at Pont-l'Évêque. MacLachlan lingered for 13 days before succumbing to the wounds on 31 July 1943. He was buried at Pont-l'Évêque Communal Cemetery in Grave 4, Zone 7. French civilian Monsieur Huet and his son attended the funeral that was administered by a German priest. They took a photograph of the grave which was covered in flowers by French civilians. A wooden plaque was placed there with the words "He died so France might live"— German authorities quickly had it removed. Page learned years later that MacLachlan survived the crash and died weeks afterwards. MacLachlan's wartime score was 16 aircraft claimed destroyed, one shared with three aircraft claimed damaged.

== Honours and awards ==
- 16 July 1940 – Flying Officer James McLachlan (39639) of No. 88 Squadron is awarded the Distinguished Flying Cross for gallantry displayed in flying operations against the enemy:

No citation given

- 11 February 1941 – Flight Lieutenant James McLachlan DFC (39639) of No. 261 Squadron is awarded the Bar to the DFC for gallantry displayed in flying operations against the enemy:

During intensive operations one day in January 1941 this officer destroyed four and possibly five enemy aircraft. Ten days previously he destroyed two enemy aircraft, one of which he had pursued for many miles out to sea. Flight Lieutenant McLachlan has set a fine example of courage, initiative and leadership.

— London Gazette

- 29 May 1942 – Squadron leader James McLachlan DFC and Bar (39639) of No. 1 Squadron is awarded the Distinguished Service Order for gallantry displayed in flying operations against the enemy:

During the early part of the war, this officer served in the Middle East where he destroyed eight enemy aircraft. Following an injury, his left arm was amputated, but, within a few weeks, he was flying again. Since his return to England, Squadron Leader MacLachlan has trained intensively in night flying operations and has achieved much success. On one night in May 1942, near Dinard, he show down a Dornier 217 and a few minutes later he shot down a Heinkel 111. The later burst into flames on impact with the ground, causing a fire which could be observed from a distance of 10 miles. Squadron Leader MacLachlan has attacked goods trains, trucks and barges with damaging effect. He is a gallant and skillful pilot whose example is an inspiration to all pilots.

— London Gazette

- 30 July 1943 – Squadron leader James McLachlan DFC and Bar (39639) of ADFU flight is awarded a second Bar to the DFC for gallantry displayed in flying operations against the enemy:

Recently these officers in the course of an operation over enemy occupied territory, shot down six enemy aircraft, three of which were destroyed by Squadron leader MacLachlan and two by Flight Lieutenant Page, while the other was destroyed jointly. The operation, which was planned by Squadron Leader MacLachlan, was brilliantly executed and the successes were worthily earned.

— London Gazette
