= Patrick McLoughlin (disambiguation) =

Patrick McLoughlin (born 1957) is a British politician.

Patrick McLoughlin may also refer to:

- Patrick McLoughlin (set decorator)
- Patrick McLoughlin (editor) (1835–1882), newspaper editor of the Cape Colony
