= Pio Tabaiwalu =

Fijian politician (died 2020)

Pio Tabaiwalu (born 1959/1960 – 20 October 2020) was a Fijian diplomat and politician who was member of the SODELPA party.
