= Central Division, Fiji =

Division of Fiji

Coordinates: 18°00′S 178°20′E

Central Division केंद्रीय प्रभाग
- Division
- Map of Fiji showing Central division.
- Country: Fiji
- Capital: Suva

Area
  - Total: 4,293 km^{2} (1,658 sq mi)

Population (2017)
  - Total: 378,148
  - Density: 88.08/km^{2} (228.1/sq mi)

The Central Division (Fiji Hindi: केंद्रीय प्रभाग) is one of Fiji's four divisions. It consists of five provinces - Naitasiri, Namosi, Rewa, Serua and Tailevu.

The capital of the division is Suva, which is also the capital of Fiji. The division includes the eastern part of the largest island in Fiji, Viti Levu, with a few outlying islands, including Beqa. It has a land border with the Western Division on Viti Levu, and sea borders with the Northern Division and Eastern Division.

The Central Division includes most of the Kubuna Confederacy and part of the Burebasaga Confederacy, two of the three hierarchies to which Fiji's chiefs all belong. The nonconformity between the boundaries of the divisions and confederacies does not affect administration, as their functions are different.
