= List of birds of Fiji =

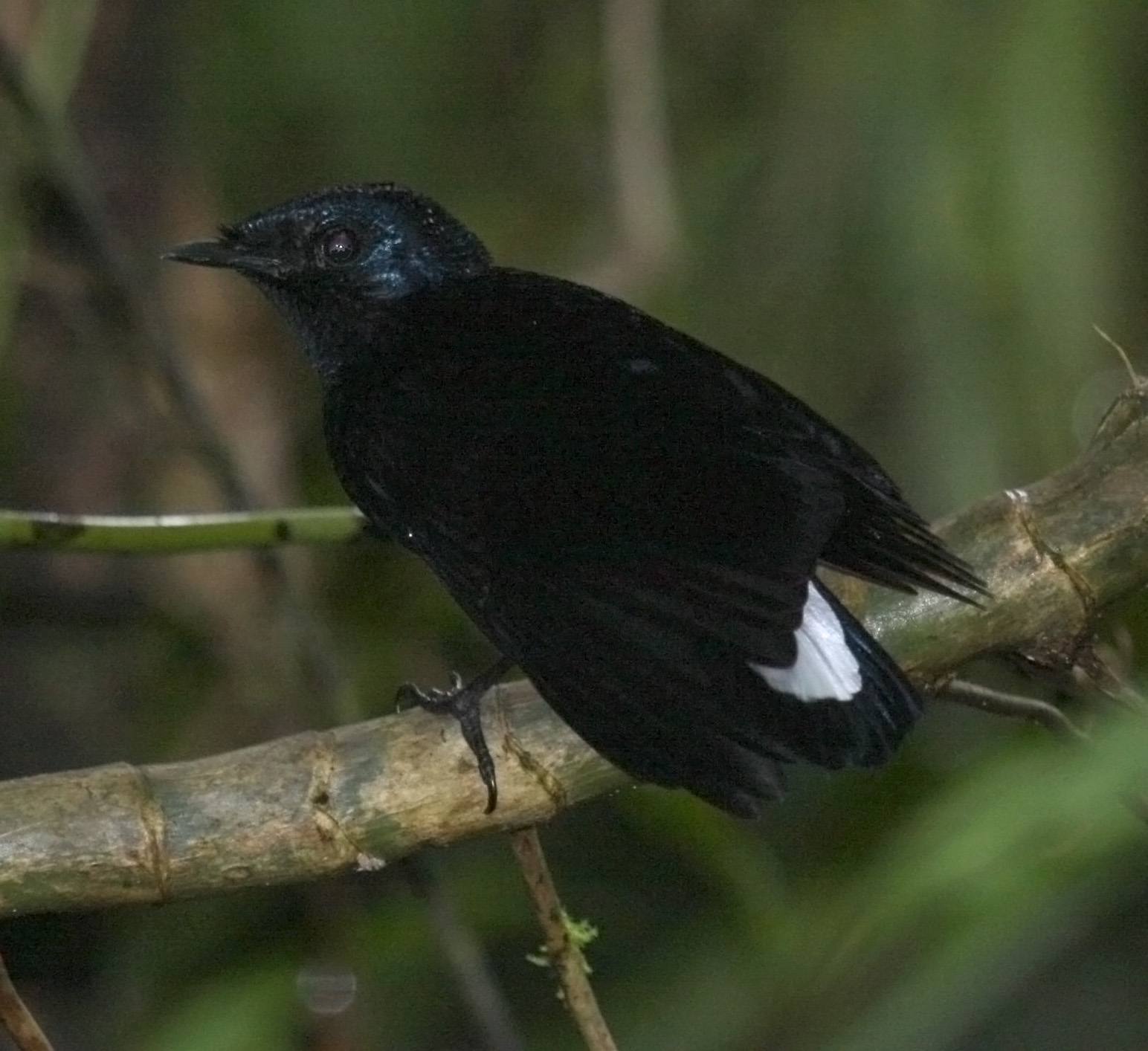
The Taveuni silktail is an endemic species and genus of Fiji.

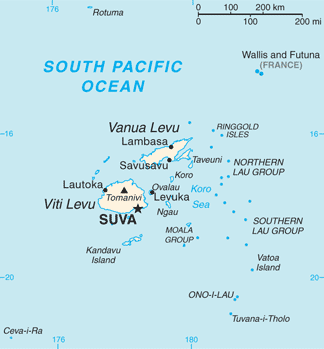
Map of Fiji showing major island groups

The avifauna of Fiji is the richest in West Polynesia. Numerous families reach the farthest east of their range, and the island is home to several endemic species and genera, as well as sharing several more endemics with its close neighbours Tonga and Samoa.

The birds of Fiji have been heavily impacted by the arrival of humans. Several species (and some genera) were lost in prehistory and are known only from fossil remains. Other have become extinct more recently, and some species remain very close to extinction. It is certain that the current knowledge of the previous ranges of many species is incomplete and further research is needed.

This is a list of the bird species recorded in Fiji. The avifauna of Fiji include a total of 179 species, of which 31 are endemic, and 13 have been introduced by humans. Numerous species listed have been extirpated from Fiji.

This list's taxonomic treatment (designation and sequence of orders, families and species) and nomenclature (common and scientific names) follow the conventions of The Clements Checklist of Birds of the World, 2022 edition. The family accounts at the beginning of each heading reflect this taxonomy, as do the species counts found in each family account. Introduced and accidental species are included in the total counts for Fiji. There are also a few species listed that have been recorded in Fiji, but not known to what specific island they were recorded at.

The following tags have been used to highlight several categories.

- (V) Vagrant - a species that rarely or accidentally occurs in Fiji
- (B) Breeder - a species that breeds in Fiji
- (M) Migrant - a species that regularly migrates to Fiji
- (P) Passage migrant - a species that neither breeds nor winters in Fiji but regularly passes through
- (I) Introduced - a species introduced to Fiji as a consequence, direct or indirect, of human actions
- (X) Extirpated - a species that no longer occurs here although populations may exist elsewhere
- (*) Endemic - a species that is endemic to Fiji
- (?) Uncertain - a species with uncertain records or current status

== Ducks, geese, and waterfowl ==
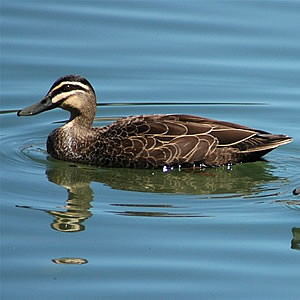
Pacific black duck

Order: Anseriformes Family: Anatidae

Anatidae includes the ducks and most duck-like waterfowl, such as geese and swans. These birds are adapted to an aquatic existence with webbed feet, flattened bills, and feathers that are excellent at shedding water due to an oily coating.

| Species | Viti Levu | Vanua Levu | Taveuni | Kadavu | Lomaiviti | Lau | Rotuma |
|---|---|---|---|---|---|---|---|
| Wandering whistling-duck Dendrocygna arcuata | X | | | | | | |
| Pacific black duck Anas superciliosa | B | B | B | B | B | | |
| Eastern spot-billed duck Anas zonorhyncha | | | | | | | |
| Mallard Anas platyrhynchos | V | | | | | | |

== Megapodes ==
Order: Galliformes Family: Megapodiidae

The Megapodiidae are stocky, medium-large chicken-like birds with small heads and large feet. All but the malleefowl occupy jungle habitats and most have brown or black colouring.

| Species | Viti Levu | Vanua Levu | Taveuni | Kadavu | Lomaiviti | Lau | Rotuma |
|---|---|---|---|---|---|---|---|
| Consumed scrubfowl Megapodius alimentum | | | | | | X | |
| Viti Levu scrubfowl Megapodius amissus * | X | | | | | X | |
| Melanesian scrubfowl Megapodius eremita | | | | | | | |

== Sylviornithids ==
Pangalliformes Family: Sylviornithidae

Sylviornithids are an extinct lineage of flightless birds related to modern Galliformes. They are represented by two species, one of them native to Fiji.

| Species | Viti Levu | Vanua Levu | Taveuni | Kadavu | Lomaiviti | Lau | Rotuma |
|---|---|---|---|---|---|---|---|
| Noble megapode Megavitiornis altirostris | X | | | | | | |

== Pheasants, grouse, and allies ==
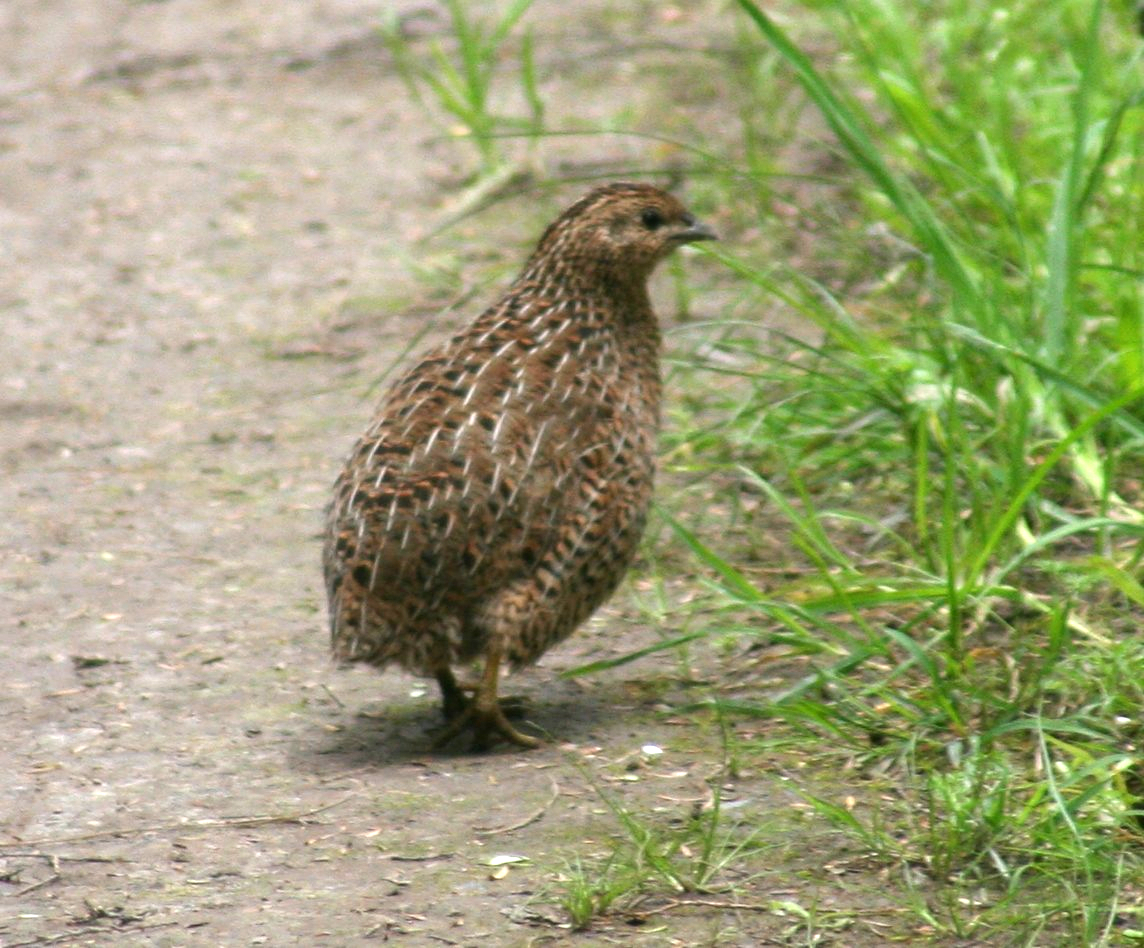
Brown quail

Order: Galliformes Family: Phasianidae

The Phasianidae are a family of terrestrial birds. In general, they are plump (although they vary in size) and have broad, relatively short wings.

| Species | Viti Levu | Vanua Levu | Taveuni | Kadavu | Lomaiviti | Lau | Rotuma |
|---|---|---|---|---|---|---|---|
| Brown quail Synoicus ypsilophorus | I | I | | | | | |
| Red junglefowl Gallus gallus | IX | IX | I | I | I | I | I |
| Wild turkey Meleagris gallopavo | I | | | | | | |

== Pigeons and doves ==
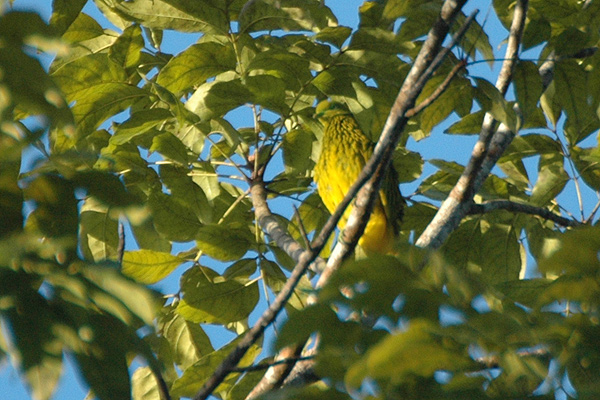
Golden fruit dove

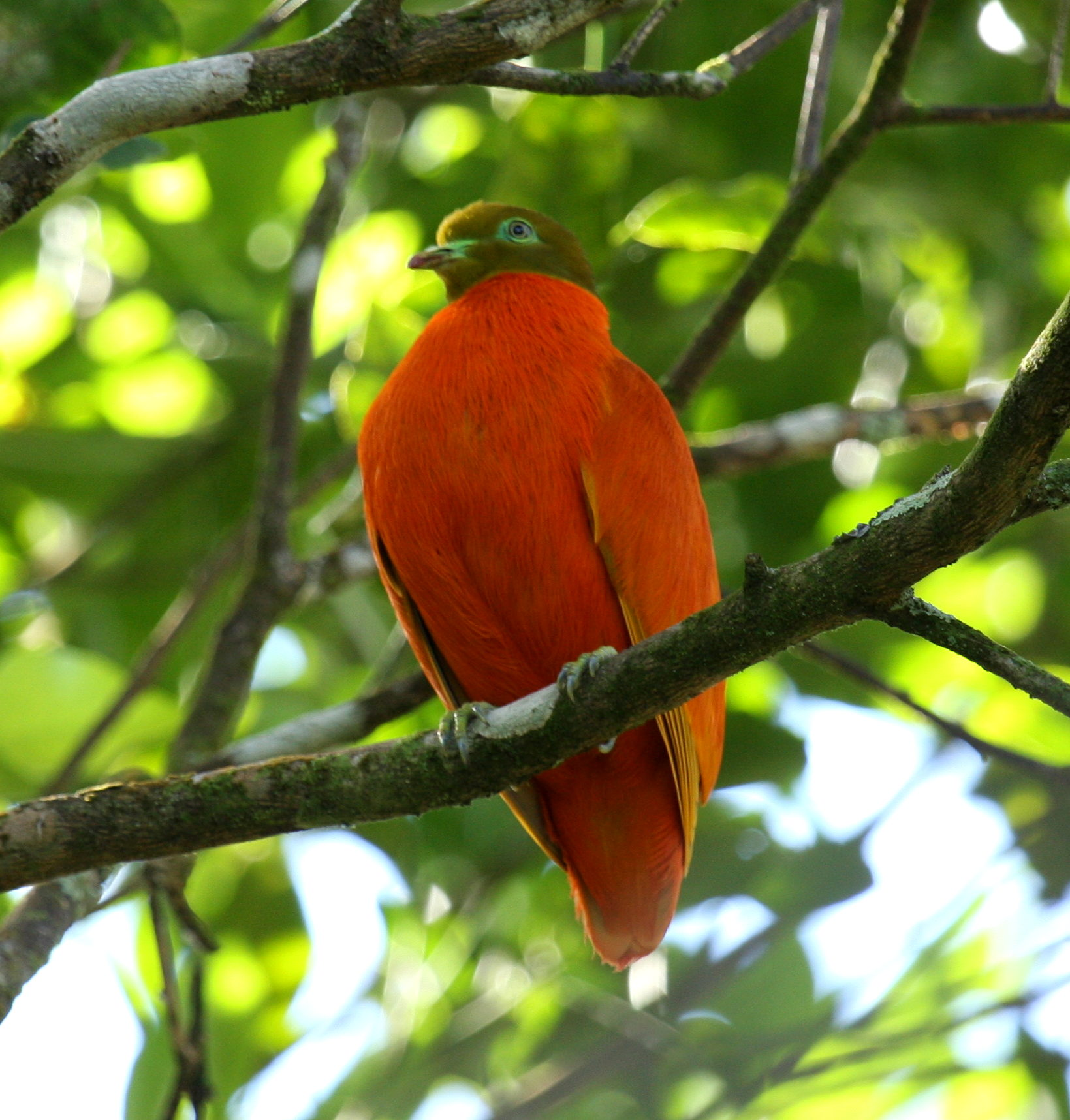
Orange fruit dove

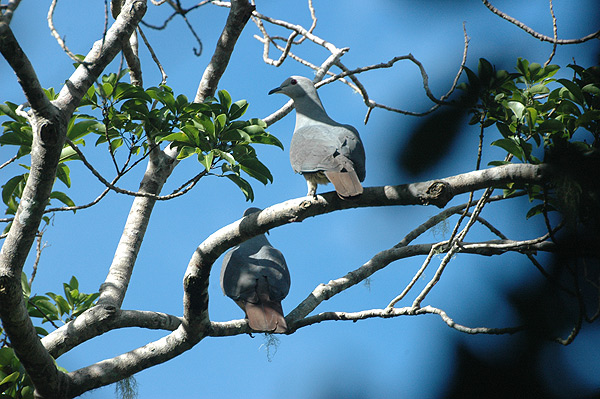
Barking imperial pigeon

Order: Columbiformes Family: Columbidae

Pigeons and doves are stout-bodied birds with short necks and short slender bills with a fleshy cere.

| Species | Viti Levu | Vanua Levu | Taveuni | Kadavu | Lomaiviti | Lau | Rotuma |
|---|---|---|---|---|---|---|---|
| Rock dove Columba livia | I | I | I | | | | |
| Metallic pigeon Columba vitiensis | B | B | B | B | B | B | |
| Spotted dove Spilopelia chinensis | I | I | I | | | I | |
| Shy ground dove Alopecoenas stairi | B | B | B | B | B | B | |
| Many-colored fruit-dove Ptilinopus perousii | B | B | B | B | B | B | |
| Crimson-crowned fruit dove Ptilinopus porphyraceus | | | | | | B | B |
| Orange dove Ptilinopus victor* | | B | B | | | | |
| Golden dove Ptilinopus luteovirens* | B | | | | B | | |
| Velvet dove Ptilinopus layardi* | | | | B | | | |
| Pacific imperial-pigeon Ducula pacifica | | | | | B | B | B |
| Peale's imperial-pigeon Ducula latrans* | B | B | B | B | B | B | |
| Lau imperial-pigeon Ducula lakeba | X | | | | | X | |
| Viti Levu giant pigeon Natunaornis gigoura* | X | | | | | | |

== Cuckoos ==
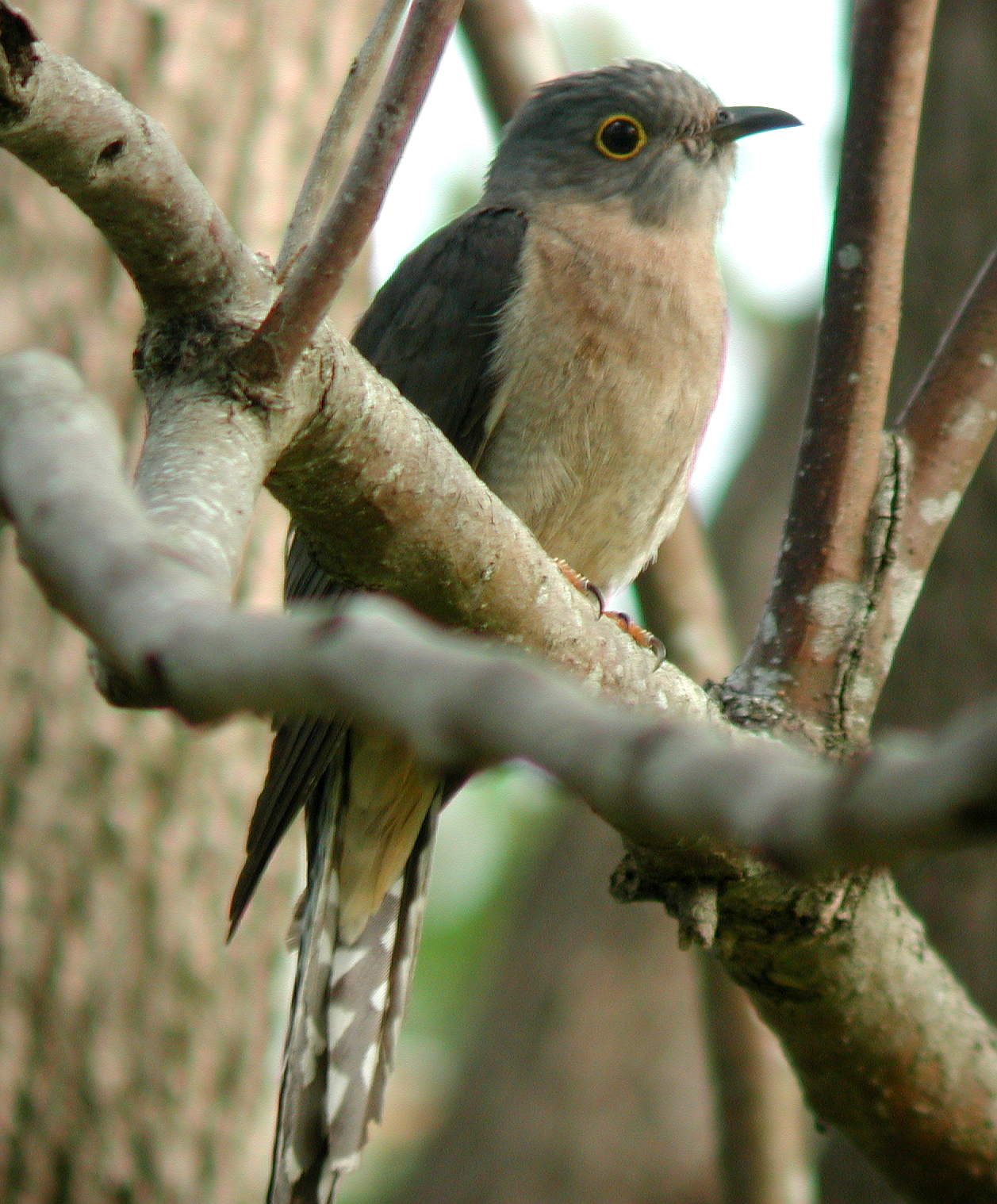
Fan-tailed cuckoo

Order: Cuculiformes Family: Cuculidae

The family Cuculidae includes cuckoos, roadrunners and anis. These birds are of variable size with slender bodies, long tails and strong legs. The Old World cuckoos are brood parasites.

| Species | Viti Levu | Vanua Levu | Taveuni | Kadavu | Lomaiviti | Lau | Rotuma |
|---|---|---|---|---|---|---|---|
| Long-tailed koel Urodynamis taitensis | M | M | M | M | M | M | |
| Fan-tailed cuckoo Cacomantis flabelliformis | B | B | B | B | B | | |

== Frogmouths ==
Order: Caprimulgiformes Family: Podargidae

The frogmouths are a group of nocturnal birds related to the nightjars. They are named for their large flattened hooked bill and huge frog-like gape, which they use to take insects.

| Species | Viti Levu | Vanua Levu | Taveuni | Kadavu | Lomaiviti | Lau | Rotuma |
|---|---|---|---|---|---|---|---|
| Tawny frogmouth Podargus strigoides | I | | | | | | |

== Swifts ==
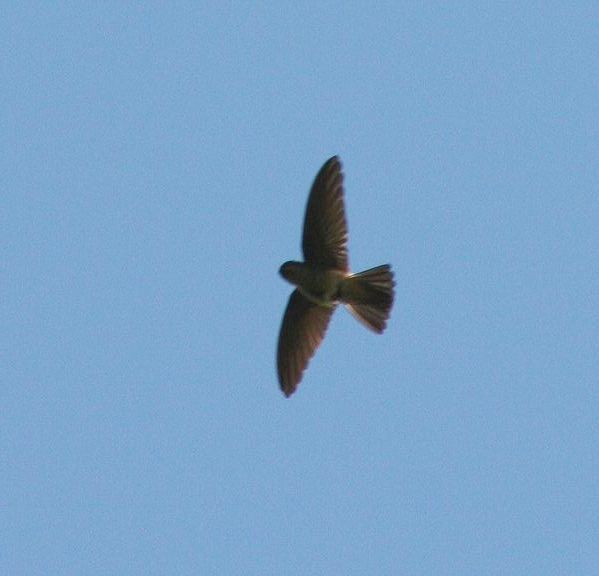
White-rumped swiftlet

Order: Caprimulgiformes Family: Apodidae

Swifts are small birds which spend the majority of their lives flying. These birds have very short legs and never settle voluntarily on the ground, perching instead only on vertical surfaces. Many swifts have long swept-back wings which resemble a crescent or boomerang.

| Species | Viti Levu | Vanua Levu | Taveuni | Kadavu | Lomaiviti | Lau | Rotuma |
|---|---|---|---|---|---|---|---|
| White-throated needletail Hirundapus caudacutus | V | | | | | | |
| White-rumped swiftlet Aerodramus spodiopygius | B | B | B | B | B | B | |
| Australian swiftlet Aerodramus terraereginae | | | | | | | |

== Rails, gallinules, and coots ==
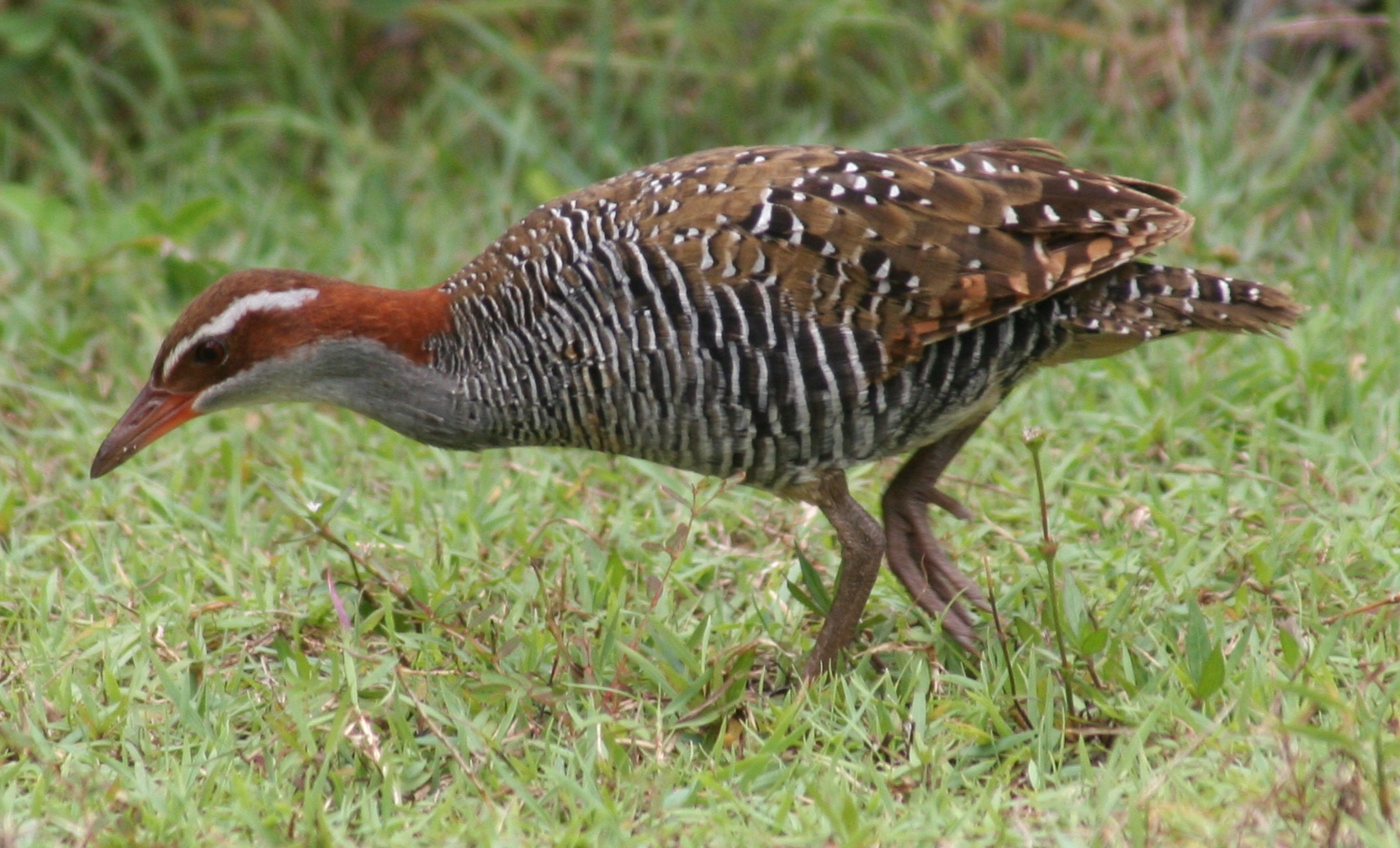
Buff-banded rail

Order: Gruiformes Family: Rallidae

Rallidae is a large family of small to medium-sized birds which includes the rails, crakes, coots and gallinules. Typically they inhabit dense vegetation in damp environments near lakes, swamps or rivers. In general they are shy and secretive birds, making them difficult to observe. Most species have strong legs and long toes which are well adapted to soft uneven surfaces. They tend to have short, rounded wings and to be weak fliers.

| Species | Viti Levu | Vanua Levu | Taveuni | Kadavu | Lomaiviti | Lau | Rotuma |
|---|---|---|---|---|---|---|---|
| Buff-banded rail Gallirallus philippensis | X | X | B | B | B | B | B |
| Bar-winged rail Gallirallus poecilopterus* | | | | | | | |
| Black-backed swamphen Porphyrio indicus | | | | | | | |
| Australasian swamphen Porphyrio melanotus | X | X | B | B | B | B | B |
| Viti Levu rail Vitirallus watlingi* | X | | | | | | |
| White-browed crake Poliolimnas cinereus | B | B | B | B | B | B | |
| Spotless crake Zapornia tabuensis | B | B | B | B | B | B | |

== Plovers and lapwings ==
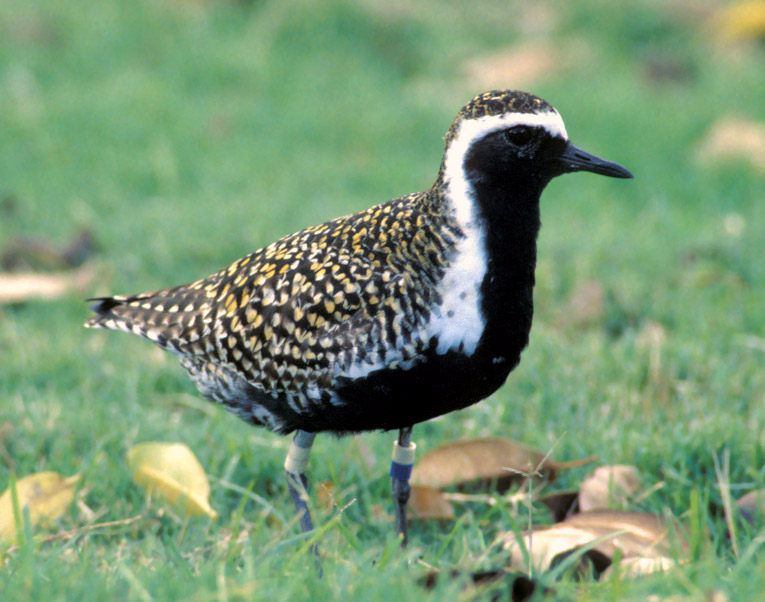
Pacific golden plover

Order: Charadriiformes Family: Charadriidae

The family Charadriidae includes the plovers, dotterels and lapwings. They are small to medium-sized birds with compact bodies, short, thick necks and long, usually pointed, wings. They are found in open country worldwide, mostly in habitats near water.

| Species | Viti Levu | Vanua Levu | Taveuni | Kadavu | Lomaiviti | Lau | Rotuma |
|---|---|---|---|---|---|---|---|
| Black-bellied plover Pluvialis squatarola | V | | | | | | |
| Pacific golden-plover Pluvialis fulva | M | M | M | M | M | M | M |
| Masked lapwing Vanellus miles | V | | | | | | |
| Lesser sand-plover Charadrius mongolus | V | | | | | | |
| Caspian plover Charadrius asiaticus | V | | | | | | |
| Double-banded plover Charadrius bicinctus | V | | | | | | |

== Sandpipers and allies ==
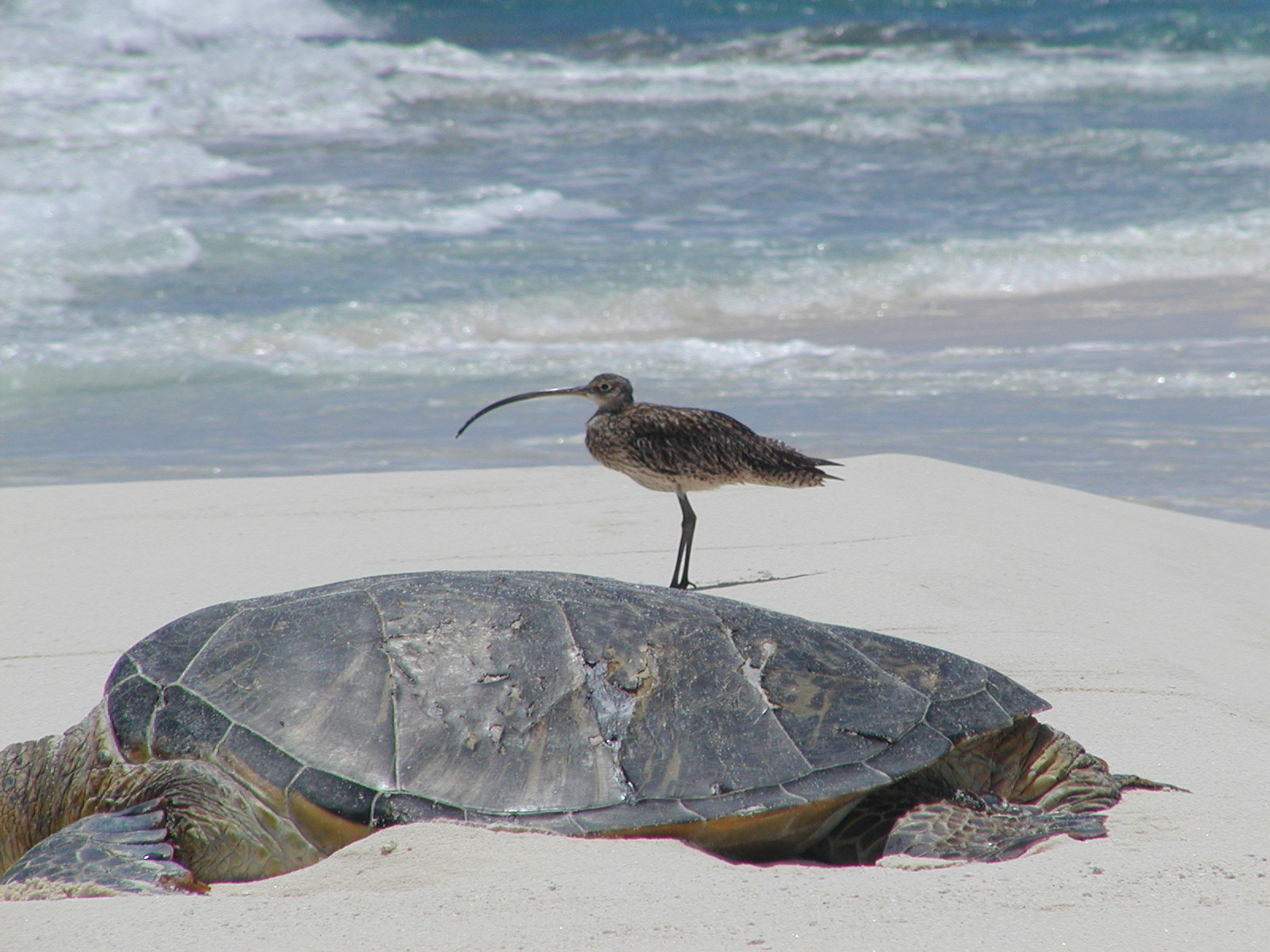
The Far Eastern curlew, an occasional visitor

Order: Charadriiformes Family: Scolopacidae

Scolopacidae is a large diverse family of small to medium-sized shorebirds including the sandpipers, curlews, godwits, shanks, tattlers, woodcocks, snipes, dowitchers and phalaropes. The majority of these species eat small invertebrates picked out of the mud or soil. Variation in length of legs and bills enables multiple species to feed in the same habitat, particularly on the coast, without direct competition for food.

| Species | Viti Levu | Vanua Levu | Taveuni | Kadavu | Lomaiviti | Lau | Rotuma |
|---|---|---|---|---|---|---|---|
| Bristle-thighed curlew Numenius tahitiensis | M | M | M | M | M | M | M |
| Whimbrel Numenius phaeopus | M | M | M | M | M | M | M |
| Far Eastern curlew Numenius madagascariensis | V | | | | | | |
| Bar-tailed godwit Limosa lapponica | M | M | M | M | M | M | M |
| Hudsonian godwit Limosa haemastica | V | | | | | | |
| Ruddy turnstone Arenaria interpres | M | M | M | M | M | M | M |
| Red knot Calidris canutus | V | | | | | | |
| Ruff Calidris pugnax | V | | | | | | |
| Sharp-tailed sandpiper Calidris acuminata | | | | | | | |
| Curlew sandpiper Calidris ferruginea | V | | | | | | |
| Red-necked stint Calidris ruficollis | V | | | | | | |
| Sanderling Calidris alba | | | | | | | |
| Pectoral sandpiper Calidris melanotos | V | | | | | | |
| Terek sandpiper Xenus cinereus | V | | | | | | |
| Common sandpiper Actitis hypoleucos | V | | | | | | |
| Solitary sandpiper Tringa solitaria | V | | | | | | |
| Gray-tailed tattler Tringa brevipes | M | M | M | M | M | M | M |
| Wandering tattler Tringa incana | M | M | M | M | M | M | M |
| Lesser yellowlegs Tringa flavipes | V | | | | | | |
| Viti Levu snipe Coenocorypha miratropica* | X | | | | | | |

== Skuas and jaegers ==
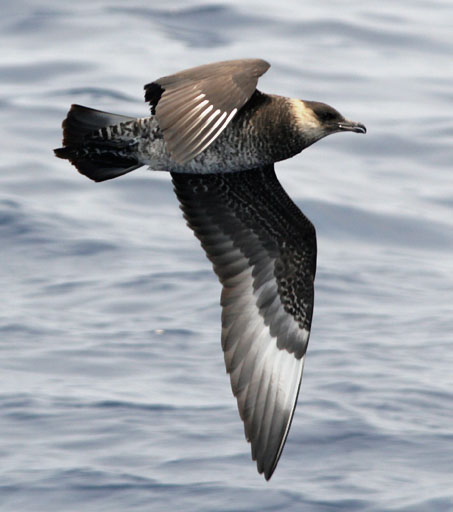
Pomarine skua

Order: Charadriiformes Family: Stercorariidae

The family Stercorariidae are, in general, medium to large birds, typically with grey or brown plumage, often with white markings on the wings. They nest on the ground in temperate and arctic regions and are long-distance migrants.

| Species | Viti Levu | Vanua Levu | Taveuni | Kadavu | Lomaiviti | Lau | Rotuma |
|---|---|---|---|---|---|---|---|
| South polar skua Stercorarius maccormicki | V | | | | | | |
| Pomarine jaeger Stercorarius pomarinus | V | | | | | | |
| Parasitic jaeger Stercorarius parasiticus | V | | | | | | |
| Long-tailed jaeger Stercorarius longicaudus | V | | | | | | |

== Gulls, terns, and skimmers ==
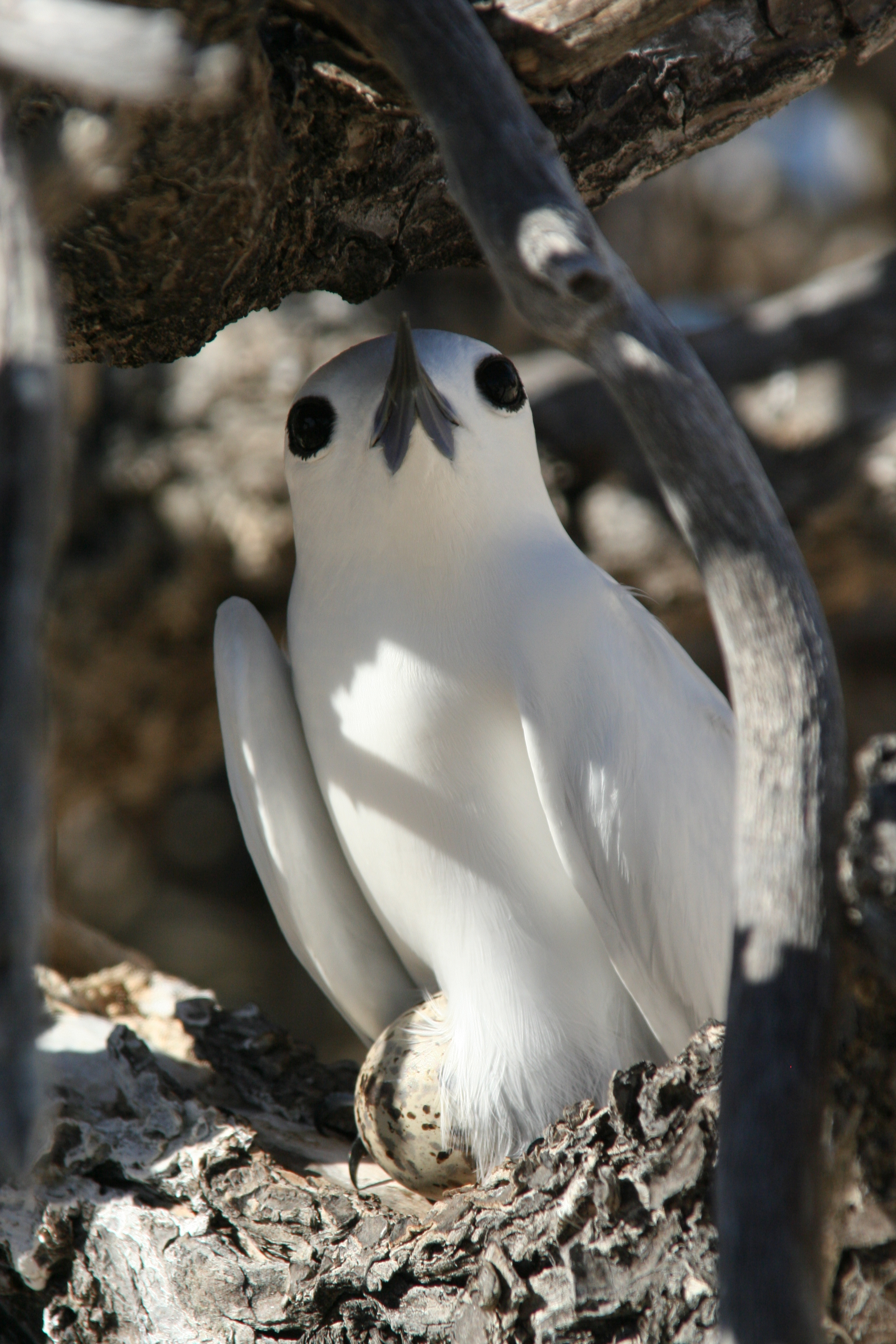
White tern

Order: Charadriiformes Family: Laridae

Laridae is a family of medium to large seabirds, the gulls, terns, and skimmers. Gulls are typically grey or white, often with black markings on the head or wings. They have stout, longish bills and webbed feet. Terns are a group of generally medium to large seabirds typically with grey or white plumage, often with black markings on the head. Most terns hunt fish by diving but some pick insects off the surface of fresh water. Terns are generally long-lived birds, with several species known to live in excess of 30 years.

| Species | Viti Levu | Vanua Levu | Taveuni | Kadavu | Lomaiviti | Lau | Rotuma |
|---|---|---|---|---|---|---|---|
| Silver gull Chroicocephalus novaehollandiae | V | | | | | | |
| Laughing gull Leucophaeus atricilla | V | | | | | | |
| Kelp gull Larus dominicanus | V | | | | | | |
| Brown noddy Anous stolidus | B | B | B | B | B | B | B |
| Black noddy Anous minutus | B | B | B | B | B | B | B |
| Blue-gray noddy Anous ceruleus | B | B | B | B | B | B | B |
| White tern Gygis alba | B | B | B | B | B | B | B |
| Sooty tern Onychoprion fuscatus | B | B | B | B | B | B | B |
| Gray-backed tern Onychoprion lunatus | | | | | | | |
| Bridled tern Onychoprion anaethetus | | | | | | | |
| Little tern Sternula albifrons | V | | | | | | |
| White-winged tern Chlidonias leucopterus | V | | | | | | |
| Black-naped tern Sterna sumatrana | B | B | B | B | B | B | |
| Common tern Sterna hirundo | P | P | P | P | P | | |
| Great crested tern Thalasseus bergii | B | B | B | B | B | B | B |

== Tropicbirds ==
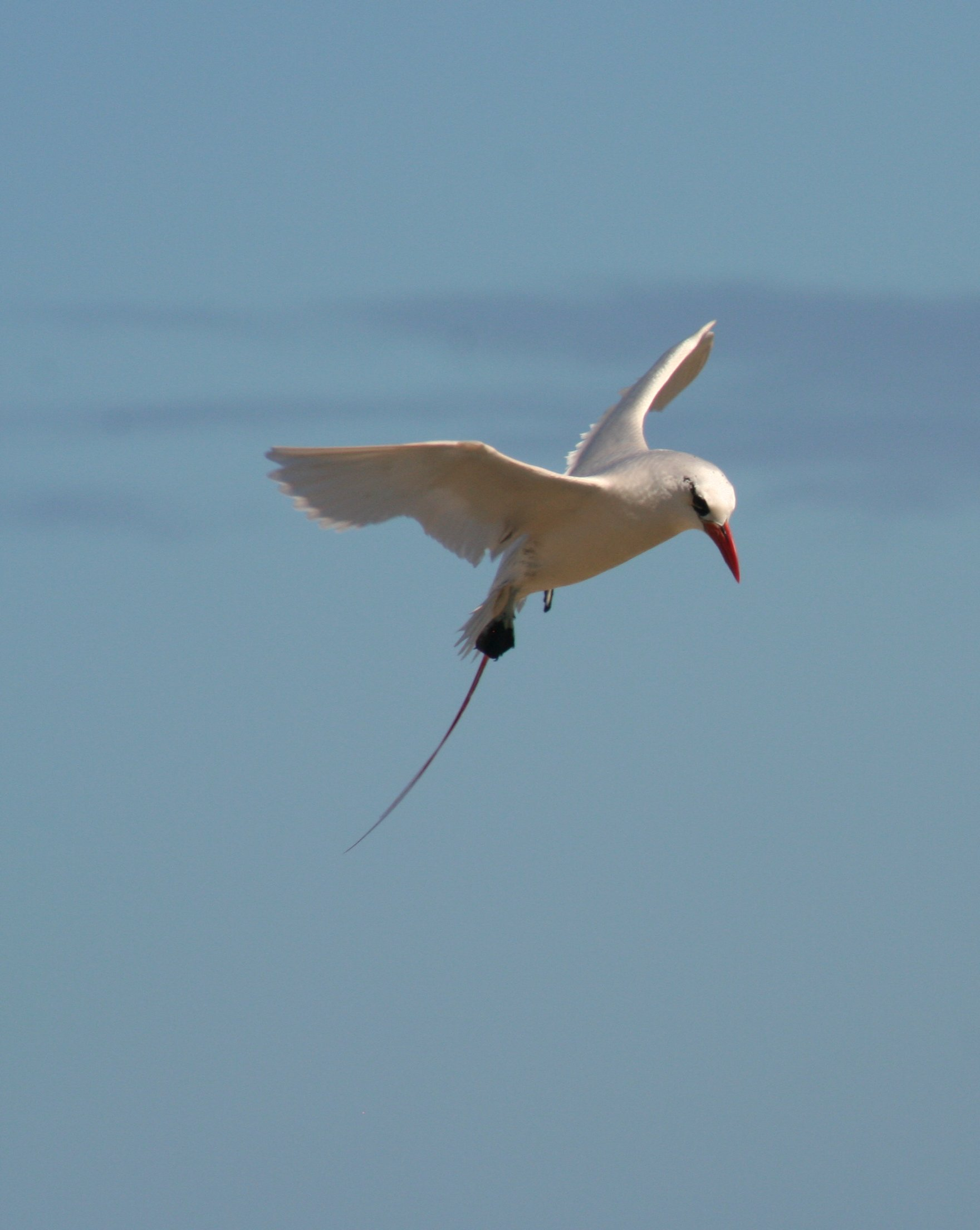
Red-tailed tropicbird

Order: Phaethontiformes Family: Phaethontidae

Tropicbirds are slender white birds of tropical oceans, with exceptionally long central tail feathers. Their heads and long wings have black markings.

| Species | Viti Levu | Vanua Levu | Taveuni | Kadavu | Lomaiviti | Lau | Rotuma |
|---|---|---|---|---|---|---|---|
| White-tailed tropicbird Phaethon lepturus | B | B | B | B | B | B | B |
| Red-tailed tropicbird Phaethon rubricauda | B | B | B | B | B | B | B |

== Albatrosses ==
Order: Procellariiformes Family: Diomedeidae

The albatrosses are among the largest of flying birds, and the great albatrosses from the genus Diomedea have the largest wingspans of any extant birds.

| Species | Viti Levu | Vanua Levu | Taveuni | Kadavu | Lomaiviti | Lau | Rotuma |
|---|---|---|---|---|---|---|---|
| Black-browed albatross Thalassarche melanophris | V | | | | | | |
| Wandering albatross Diomedea exulans | | | | | | | |

== Southern storm-petrels ==
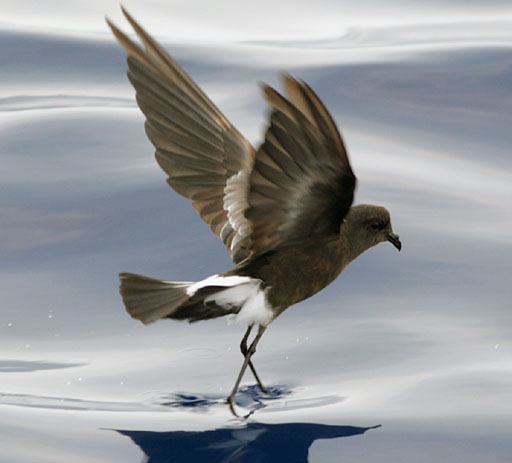
Wilson's storm petrel

Order: Procellariiformes Family: Oceanitidae

The southern storm-petrels are relatives of the petrels and are the smallest seabirds. They feed on planktonic crustaceans and small fish picked from the surface, typically while hovering. The flight is fluttering and sometimes bat-like.

| Species | Viti Levu | Vanua Levu | Taveuni | Kadavu | Lomaiviti | Lau | Rotuma |
|---|---|---|---|---|---|---|---|
| Wilson's storm-petrel Oceanites oceanicus | P | | | | | | |
| White-faced storm-petrel Pelagodroma marina | V | | | | | | |
| White-bellied storm-petrel Fregetta grallaria | V | | | | | | |
| New Zealand storm-petrel Fregetta maoriana | V | | | | | | |
| Black-bellied storm-petrel Fregetta tropica | V | | | | | | |
| Polynesian storm-petrel Nesofregatta fuliginosa | B | B | B | B | B | | |

== Northern storm-petrels ==
Order: Procellariiformes Family: Hydrobatidae

Though the members of this family are similar in many respects to the southern storm-petrels, including their general appearance and habits, there are enough genetic differences to warrant their placement in a separate family.

| Species | Viti Levu | Vanua Levu | Taveuni | Kadavu | Lomaiviti | Lau | Rotuma |
|---|---|---|---|---|---|---|---|
| Leach's storm-petrel Hydrobates leucorhous | V | | | | | | |
| Matsudaira's storm-petrel Hydrobates matsudairae | V | | | | | | |

== Shearwaters and petrels ==
Order: Procellariiformes Family: Procellariidae

The procellariids are the main group of medium-sized "true petrels", characterised by united nostrils with medium septum and a long outer functional primary.

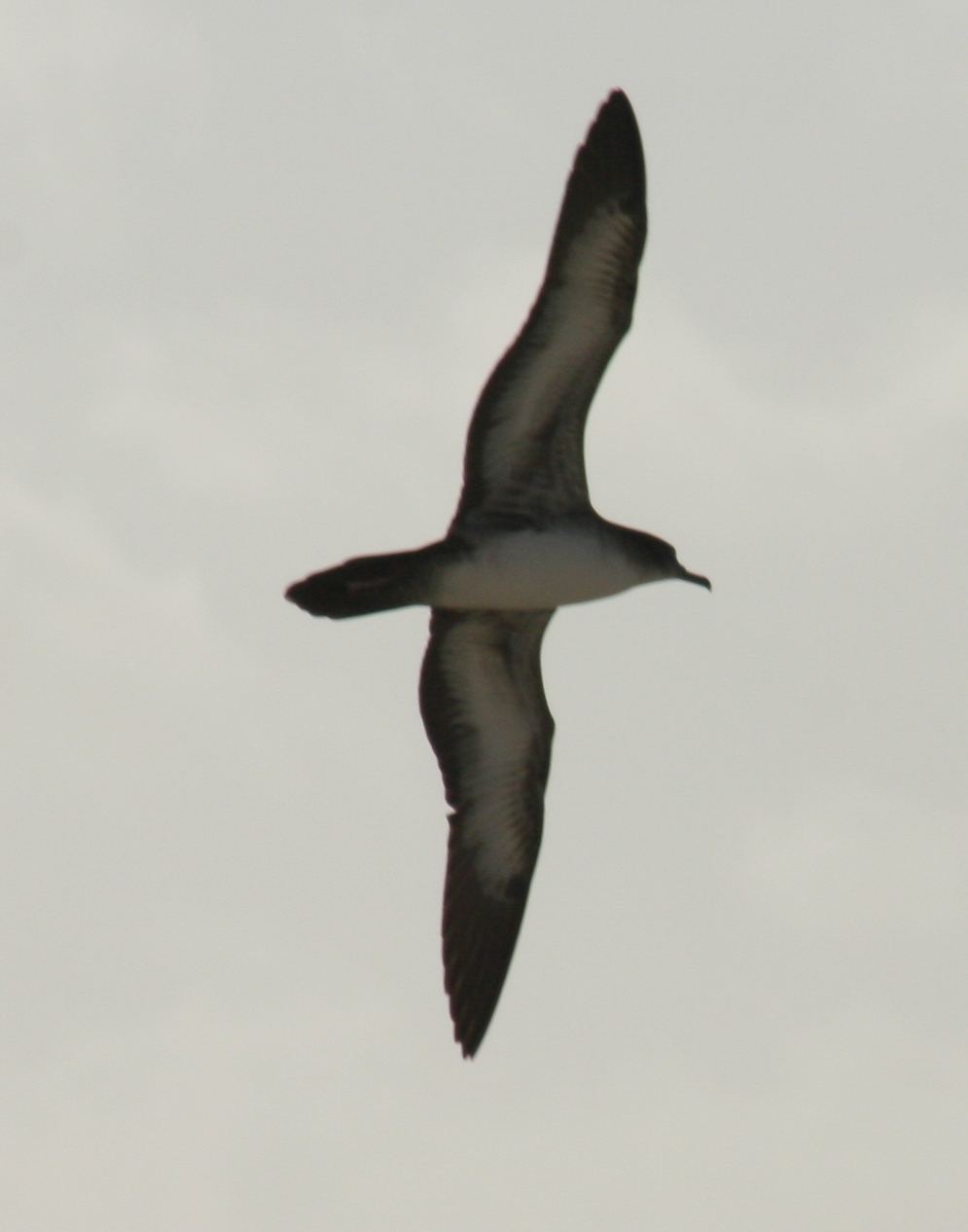
Wedge-tailed shearwater

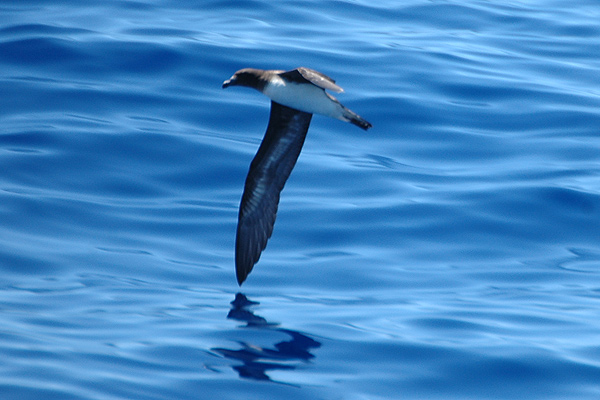
Tahiti petrel

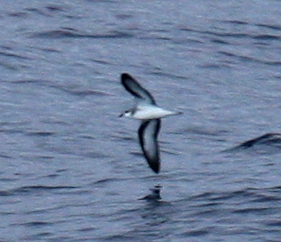
Black-winged petrel near Vanua Levu

| Species | Viti Levu | Vanua Levu | Taveuni | Kadavu | Lomaiviti | Lau | Rotuma |
|---|---|---|---|---|---|---|---|
| Southern giant-petrel Macronectes giganteus | V | | | | | | |
| Cape petrel Daption capense | V | | | | | | |
| Gray-faced petrel Pterodroma gouldi | | | | | | | |
| Kermadec petrel Pterodroma neglecta | V | | | | | | |
| Herald petrel Pterodroma heraldica | V | | | | | | |
| Murphy's petrel Pterodroma ultima | V | | | | | | |
| Providence petrel Pterodroma solandri | V | | | | | | |
| Mottled petrel Pterodroma inexpectata | P | | | | | | |
| White-necked petrel Pterodroma cervicalis | | | | | | | |
| Black-winged petrel Pterodroma nigripennis | | | | | | | |
| Gould's petrel Pterodroma leucoptera | V | | | | | | |
| Collared petrel Pterodroma brevipes | B | B | B | B | B | B | |
| Phoenix petrel Pterodroma alba | V | | | | | | |
| Fiji petrel Pseudobulweria macgillivrayi* | | | | | B | | |
| Tahiti petrel Pseudobulweria rostrata | | | B | | B | | |
| Parkinson's petrel Procellaria parkinsoni | V | | | | | | |
| Flesh-footed shearwater Ardenna carneipes | V | | | | | | |
| Wedge-tailed shearwater Ardenna pacifica | B | B | B | B | B | B | B |
| Buller's shearwater Ardenna bulleri | V | | | | | | |
| Sooty shearwater Ardenna grisea | V | | | | | | |
| Short-tailed shearwater Ardenna tenuirostris | V | | | | | | |
| Christmas shearwater Puffinus nativitatis | V | | | | | | |
| Newell's shearwater Puffinus newelli | | | | | | | |
| Tropical shearwater Puffinus bailloni | B | B | B | B | B | B | |

== Frigatebirds ==
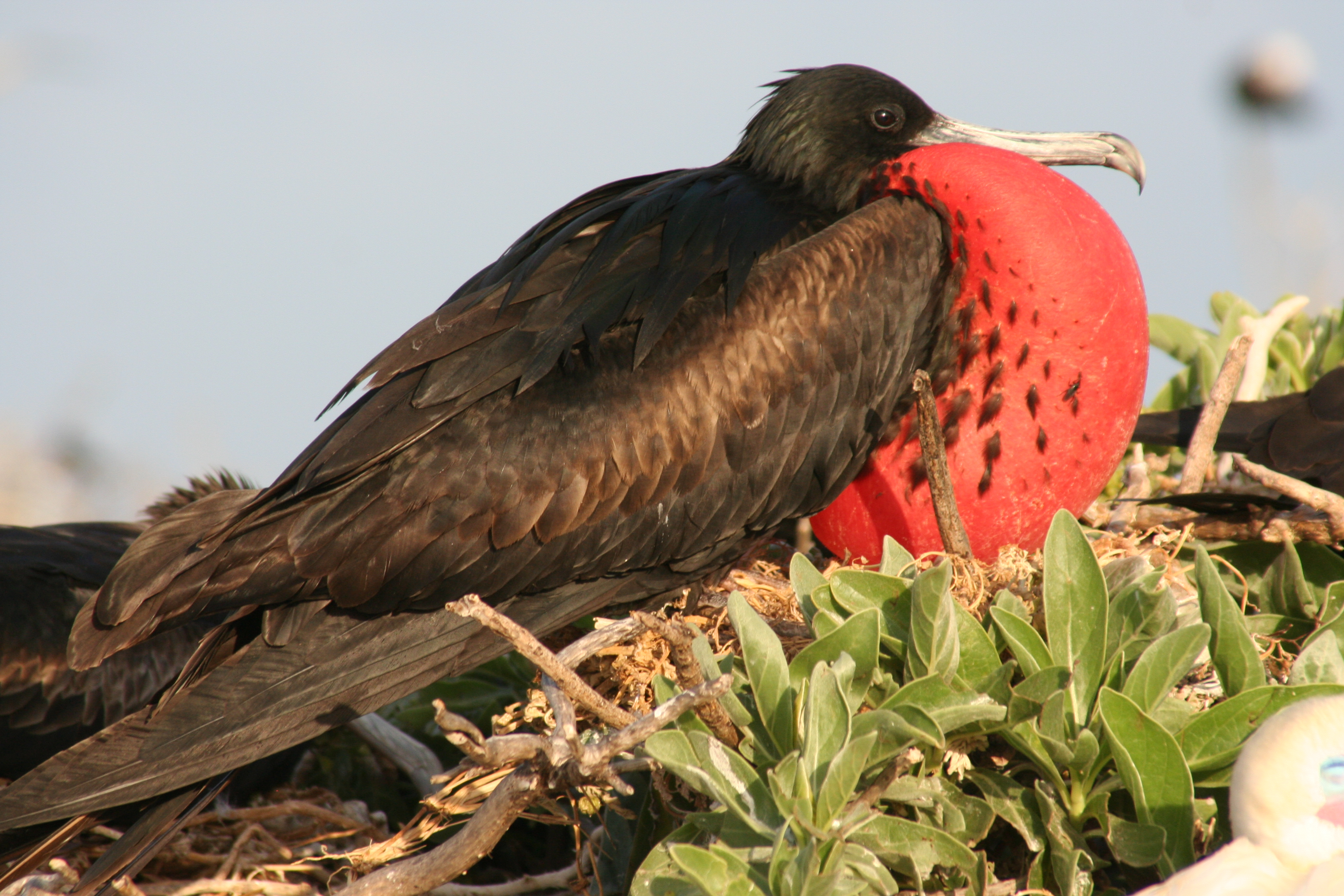
Great frigatebird

Order: Suliformes Family: Fregatidae

Frigatebirds are large seabirds usually found over tropical oceans. They are large, black-and-white or completely black, with long wings and deeply forked tails. The males have coloured inflatable throat pouches. They do not swim or walk and cannot take off from a flat surface. Having the largest wingspan-to-body-weight ratio of any bird, they are essentially aerial, able to stay aloft for more than a week.

| Species | Viti Levu | Vanua Levu | Taveuni | Kadavu | Lomaiviti | Lau | Rotuma |
|---|---|---|---|---|---|---|---|
| Lesser frigatebird Fregata ariel | B | B | B | B | B | B | B |
| Great frigatebird Fregata minor | R | R | R | R | R | R | R |

== Boobies and gannets ==
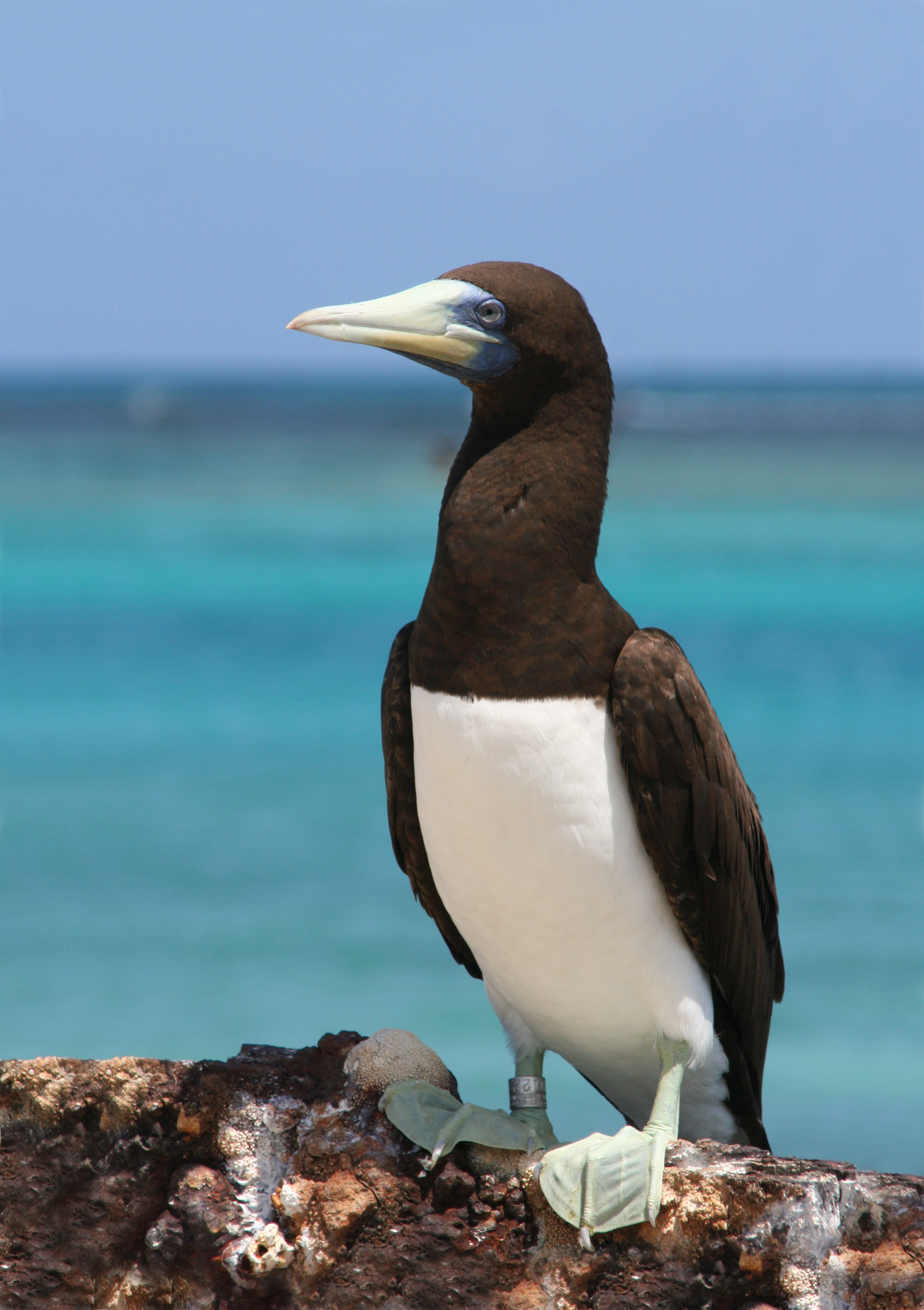
Brown booby

Order: Suliformes Family: Sulidae

The sulids comprise the gannets and boobies. Both groups are medium to large coastal seabirds that plunge-dive for fish.

| Species | Viti Levu | Vanua Levu | Taveuni | Kadavu | Lomaiviti | Lau | Rotuma |
|---|---|---|---|---|---|---|---|
| Masked booby Sula dactylatra | B | B | B | B | B | B | B |
| Brown booby Sula leucogaster | B | B | B | B | B | B | B |
| Red-footed booby Sula sula | B | B | B | B | B | B | B |

== Pelicans ==
Order: Pelecaniformes Family: Pelecanidae

Pelicans are large water birds with a distinctive pouch under their beak. As with other members of the order Pelecaniformes, they have webbed feet with four toes.

| Species | Viti Levu | Vanua Levu | Taveuni | Kadavu | Lomaiviti | Lau | Rotuma |
|---|---|---|---|---|---|---|---|
| Australian pelican Pelecanus conspicillatus | V | | | | | | |

== Herons, egrets, and bitterns ==
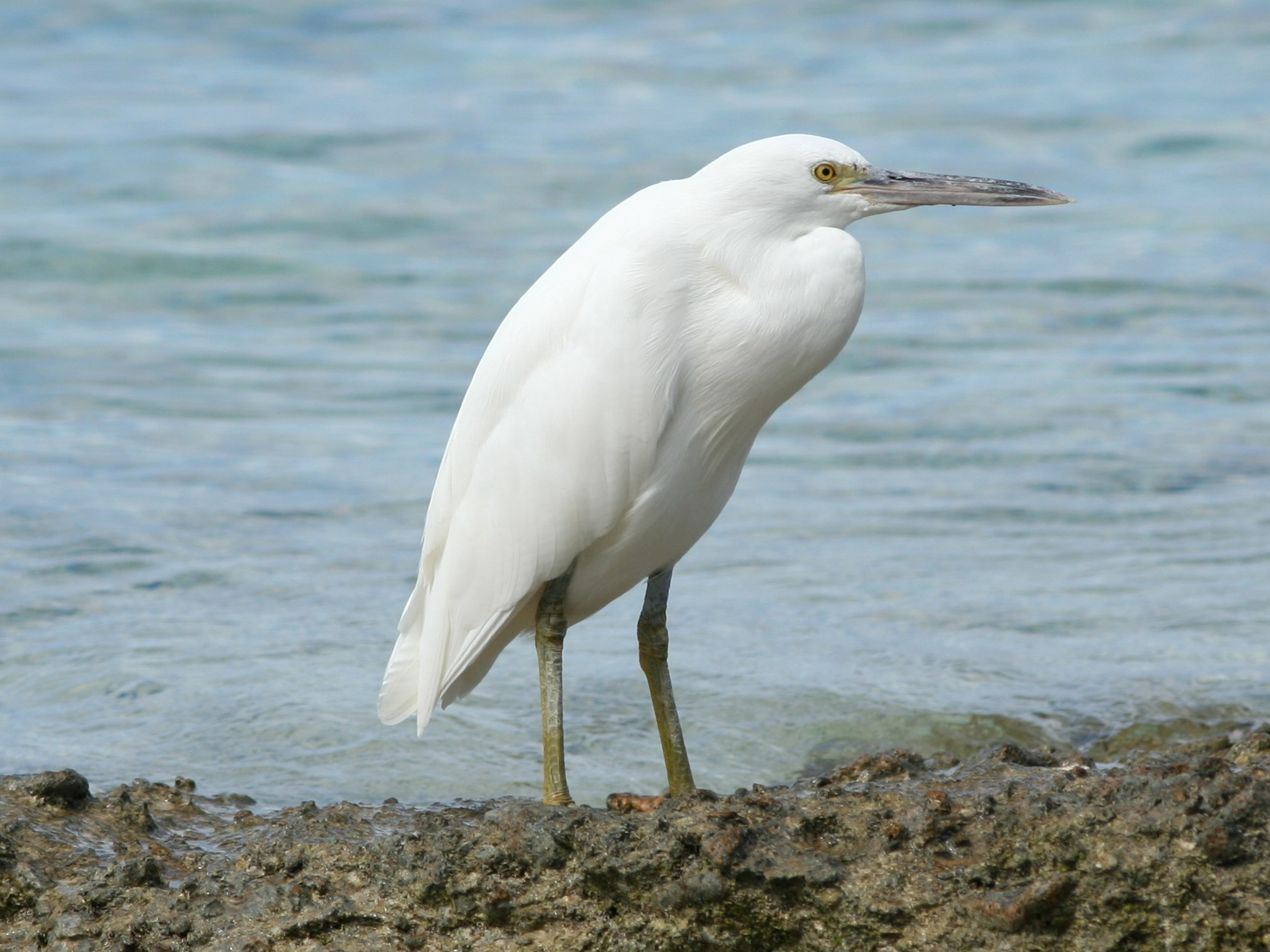
Eastern reef egret

Order: Pelecaniformes Family: Ardeidae

The family Ardeidae contains the bitterns, herons and egrets. Herons and egrets are medium to large wading birds with long necks and legs. Bitterns tend to be shorter necked and more wary. Members of Ardeidae fly with their necks retracted, unlike other long-necked birds such as storks, ibises and spoonbills.

| Species | Viti Levu | Vanua Levu | Taveuni | Kadavu | Lomaiviti | Lau | Rotuma |
|---|---|---|---|---|---|---|---|
| Great egret Ardea alba | V | | | | | | |
| White-faced heron Egretta novaehollandiae | B? | | | | | | |
| Pacific reef-egret Egretta sacra | B | B | B | B | B | B | B |
| Cattle egret Bubulcus ibis | V | | | | | | |
| Striated heron Butorides striata | B | B | B | B | B | B | |

== Ibises and spoonbills ==
Order: Pelecaniformes Family: Threskiornithidae

Threskiornithidae is a family of large terrestrial and wading birds which includes the ibises and spoonbills. They have long, broad wings with 11 primary and about 20 secondary feathers. They are strong fliers and despite their size and weight, very capable soarers.

| Species | Viti Levu | Vanua Levu | Taveuni | Kadavu | Lomaiviti | Lau | Rotuma |
|---|---|---|---|---|---|---|---|
| Glossy ibis Plegadis falcinellus | V | | | | | | |

== Hawks, eagles, and kites ==
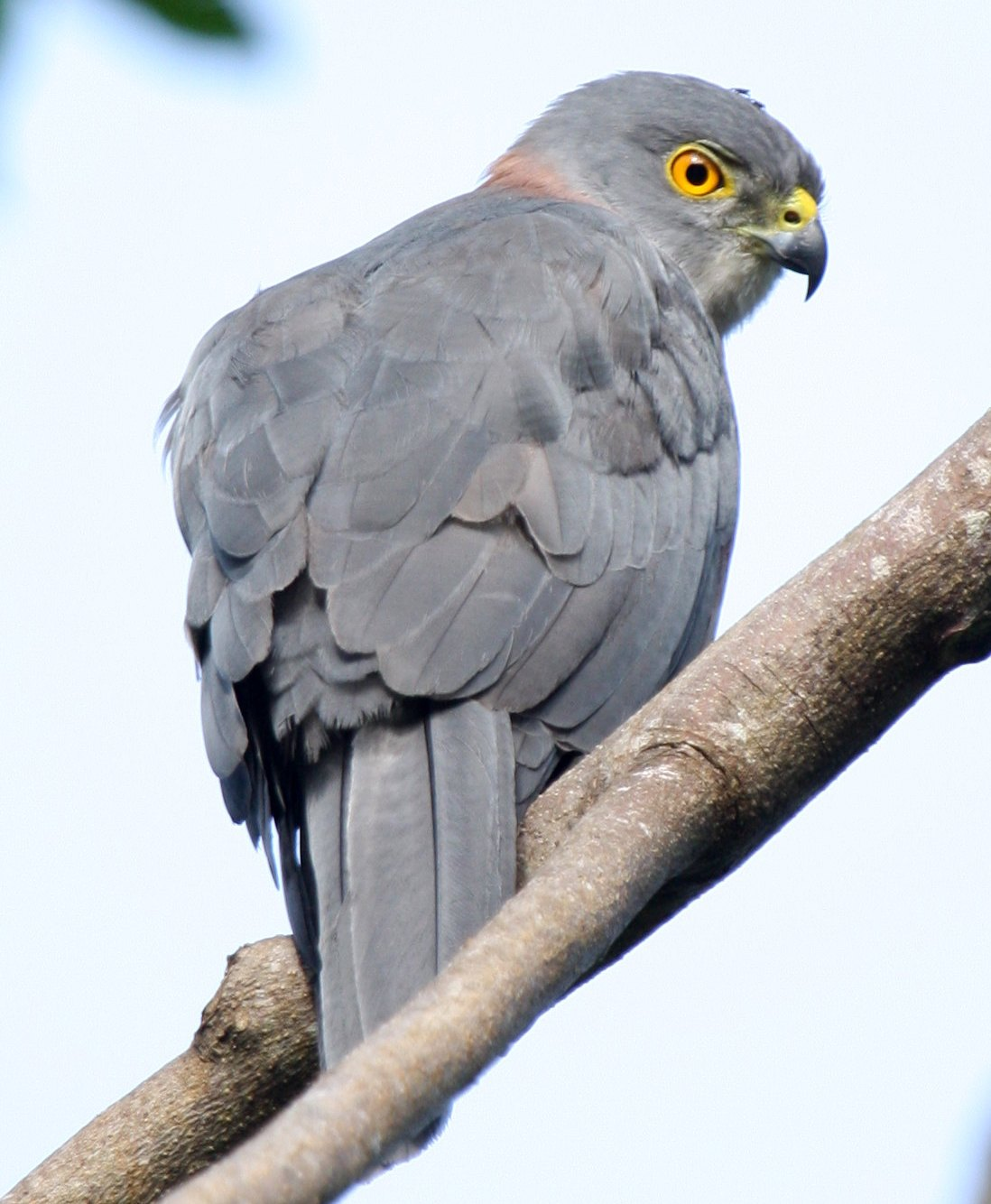
Fiji goshawk

Order: Accipitriformes Family: Accipitridae

Accipitridae is a family of birds of prey, which includes hawks, eagles, kites, harriers and Old World vultures. These birds have powerful hooked beaks for tearing flesh from their prey, strong legs, powerful talons and keen eyesight.

| Species | Viti Levu | Vanua Levu | Taveuni | Kadavu | Lomaiviti | Lau | Rotuma |
|---|---|---|---|---|---|---|---|
| Swamp harrier Circus approximans | B | B | B | B | B | B | |
| Fiji goshawk Accipiter rufitorques* | B | B | B | B | B | | |

== Barn-owls ==
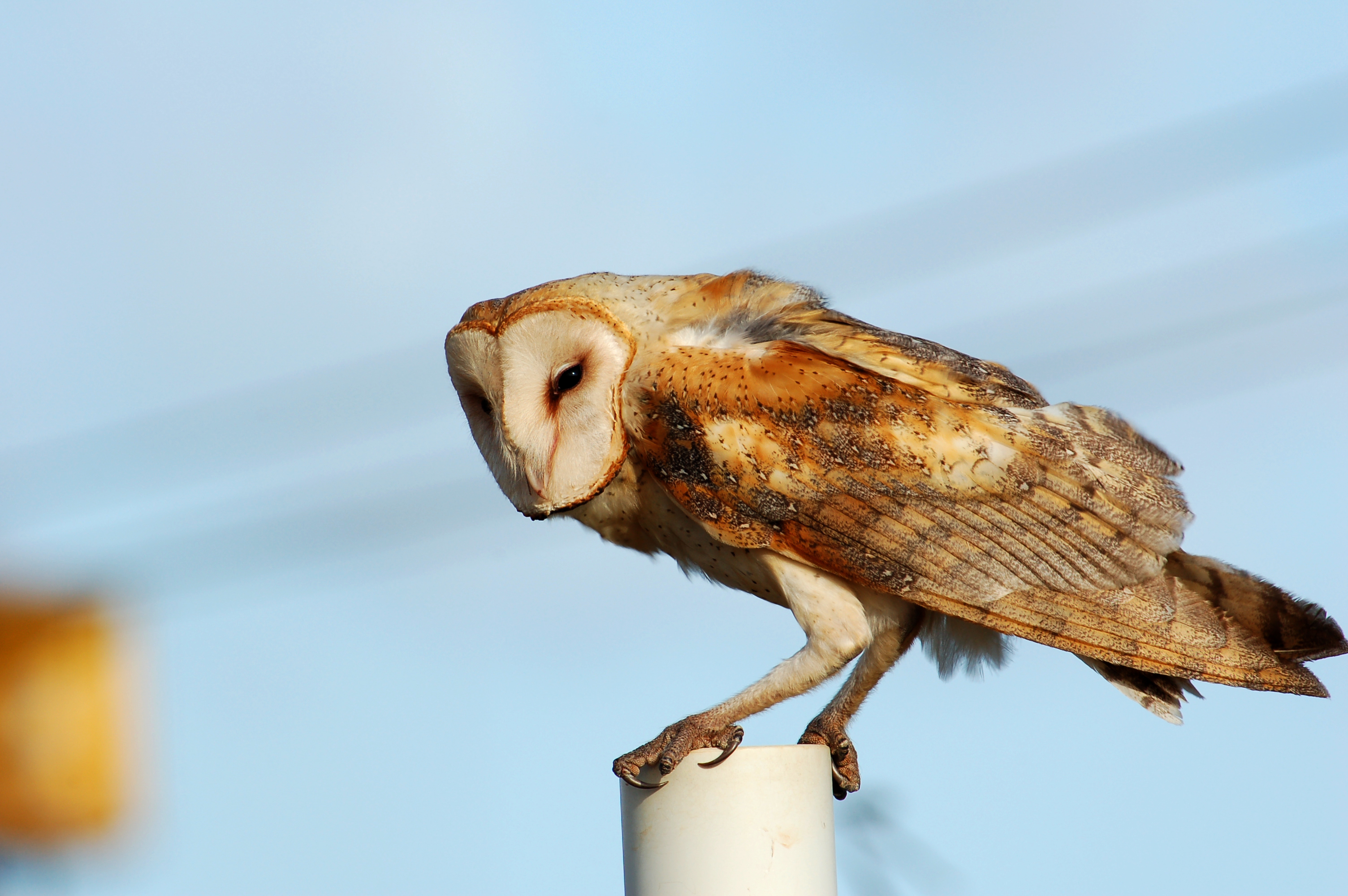
Barn owl

Order: Strigiformes Family: Tytonidae

Barn owls are medium to large owls with large heads and characteristic heart-shaped faces. They have long strong legs with powerful talons. There are 16 species worldwide and 2 species which occur in Fiji.

Tytonidae
| Species | Viti Levu | Vanua Levu | Taveuni | Kadavu | Lomaiviti | Lau | Rotuma |
|---|---|---|---|---|---|---|---|
| Australasian grass-owl Tyto longimembris | X | | | | | | |
| Eastern barn owl Tyto javanica | B | B | B | B | B | B | |

== Kingfishers ==
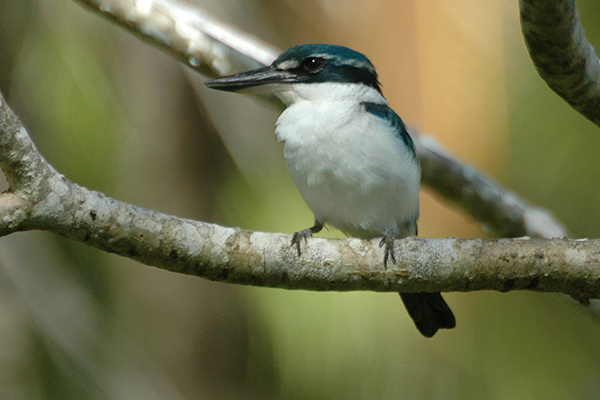
Pacific kingfisher, Fijian race

Order: Coraciiformes Family: Alcedinidae

Kingfishers are medium-sized birds with large heads, long, pointed bills, short legs and stubby tails.

| Species | Viti Levu | Vanua Levu | Taveuni | Kadavu | Lomaiviti | Lau | Rotuma |
|---|---|---|---|---|---|---|---|
| Pacific kingfisher Todirhamphus sacer | B | B | B | B | B | B | |
| Sacred kingfisher Todirhamphus sanctus | | | | | | | |

== Falcons ==
Order: Falconiformes Family: Falconidae

Falconidae is a family of diurnal birds of prey. They differ from hawks, eagles and kites in that they kill with their beaks instead of their talons.

| Species | Viti Levu | Vanua Levu | Taveuni | Kadavu | Lomaiviti | Lau | Rotuma |
|---|---|---|---|---|---|---|---|
| Peregrine falcon Falco peregrinus | B | B | B | B | B | | |

== Old World parrots ==
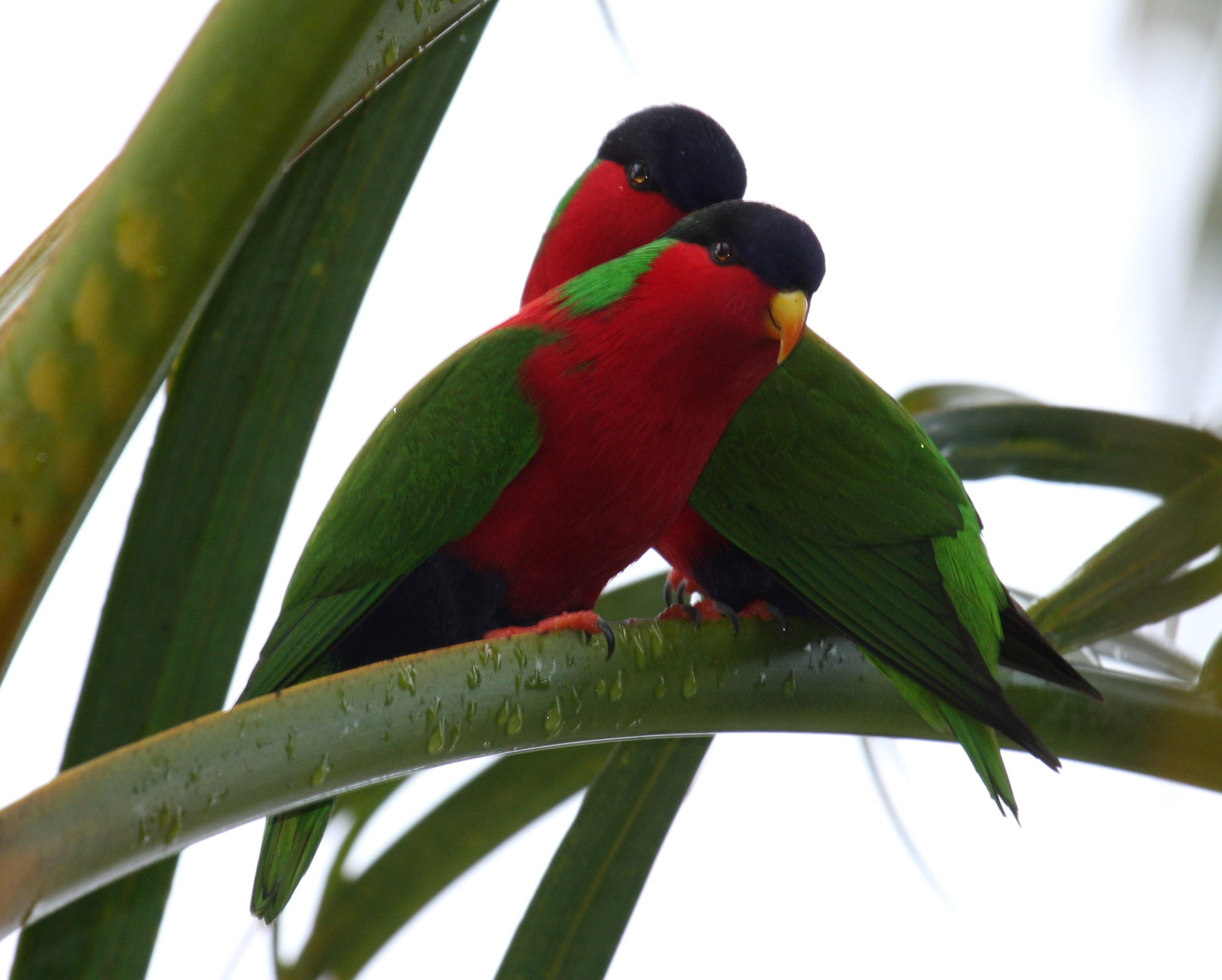
The collared lory is the national bird of Fiji.

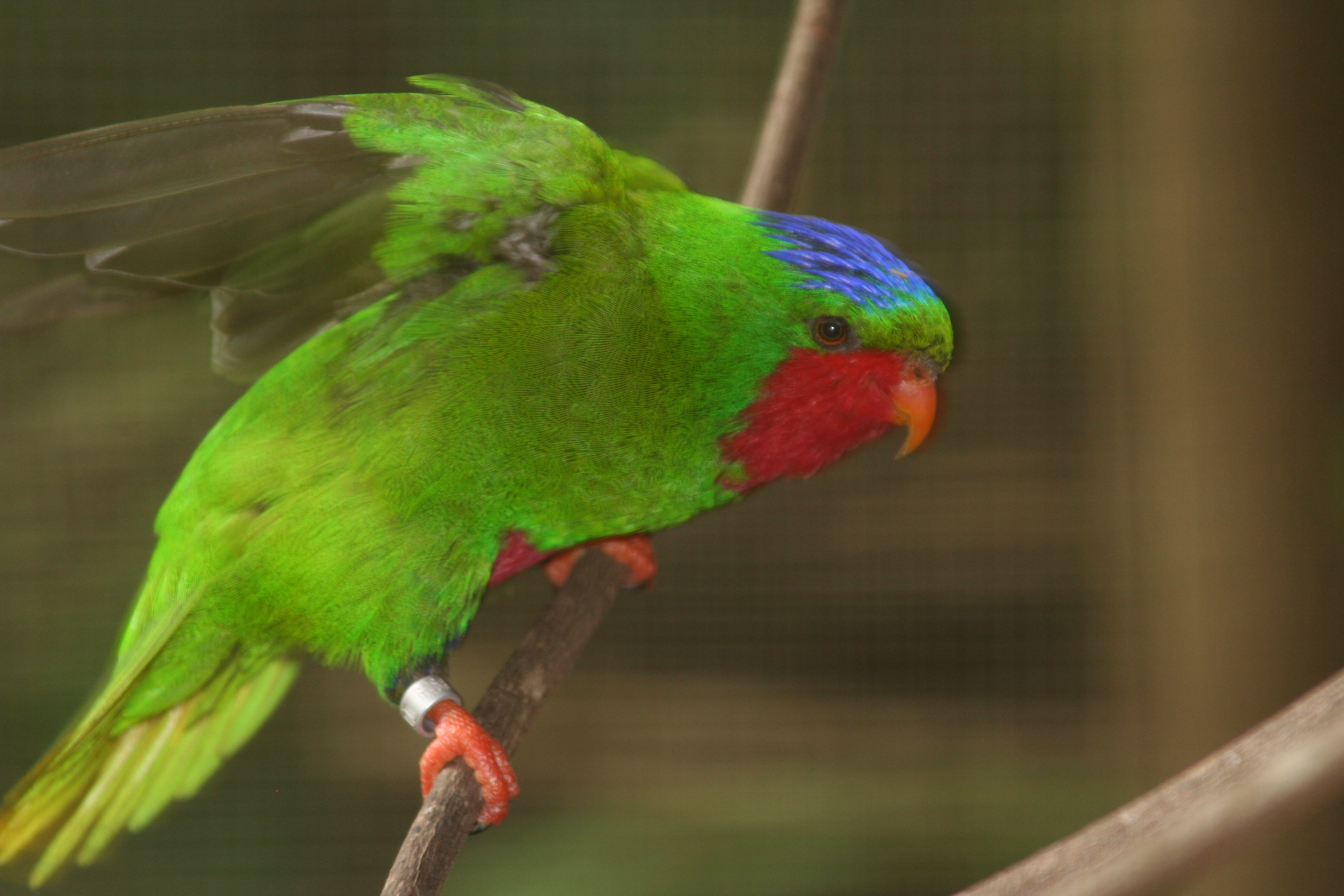
Blue-crowned lorikeet

Order: Psittaciformes Family: Psittaculidae

Characteristic features of parrots include a strong curved bill, an upright stance, strong legs, and clawed zygodactyl feet. Many parrots are vividly coloured, and some are multi-coloured. In size they range from 8 cm (3.1 in) to 1 m (3.3 ft) in length. Old World parrots are found from Africa east across south and southeast Asia and Oceania to Australia and New Zealand.

| Species | Viti Levu | Vanua Levu | Taveuni | Kadavu | Lomaiviti | Lau | Rotuma |
|---|---|---|---|---|---|---|---|
| Crimson shining-parrot Prosopeia splendens* | I | | | B | | | |
| Red shining-parrot Prosopeia tabuensis* | | B | B | | | | |
| Masked shining-parrot Prosopeia personata* | B | | | | | | |
| Red-throated lorikeet Vini amabilis* | B? | B? | B? | | X | | |
| Collared lory Vini solitarius* | B | B | B | B | B | B | |
| Blue-crowned lorikeet Vini australis | | | | | | B | |

== Honeyeaters ==
Order: Passeriformes Family: Meliphagidae

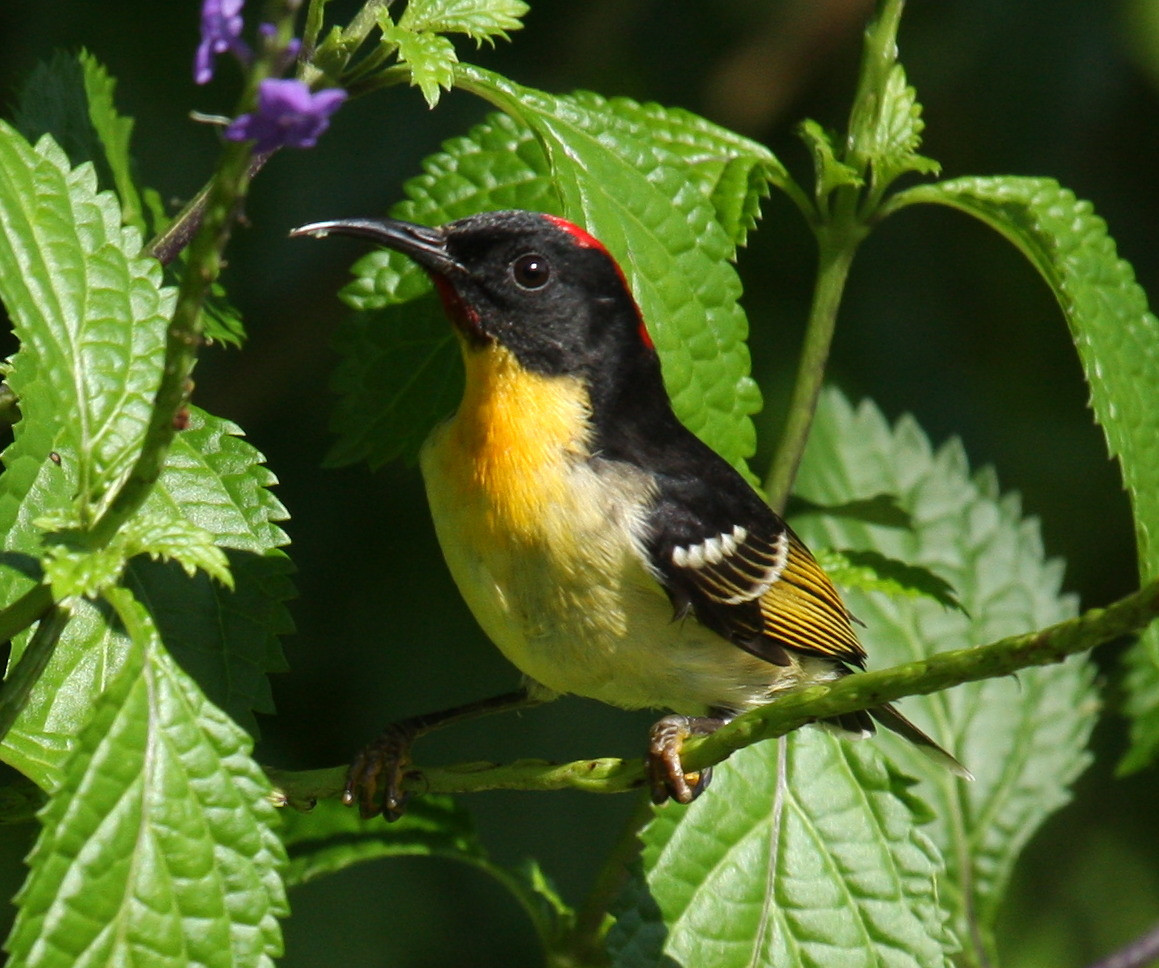
Orange-breasted honeyeater

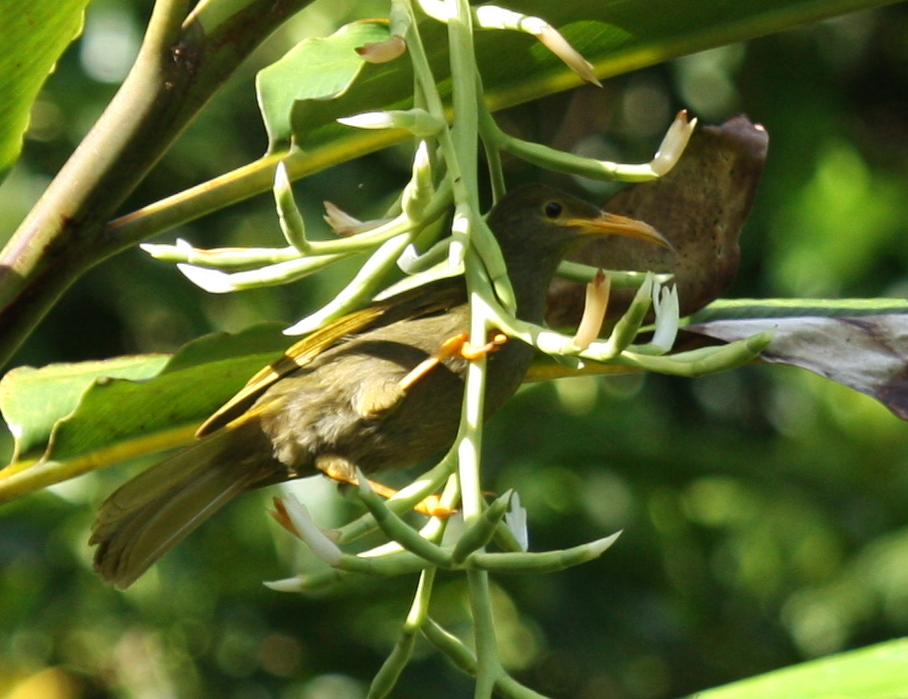
Yellow-billed honeyeater

The honeyeaters are a large and diverse family of small to medium-sized birds most common in Australia and New Guinea. They are nectar feeders and closely resemble other nectar-feeding passerines.

| Species | Viti Levu | Vanua Levu | Taveuni | Kadavu | Lomaiviti | Lau | Rotuma |
|---|---|---|---|---|---|---|---|
| Rotuma myzomela Myzomela chermesina* | | | | | | | B |
| Orange-breasted myzomela Myzomela jugularis* | B | B | B | B | B | B | |
| Kadavu honeyeater Meliphacator provocator* | | | | B | | | |
| Chattering giant-honeyeater Gymnomyza viridis* | | B | B | | | | |
| Duetting giant-honeyeater Gymnomyza brunneirostris* | B | | | | | | |
| Western wattled-honeyeater Foulehaio procerior | B | | | | | | |
| Eastern wattled-honeyeater Foulehaio carunculatus | | | | B | B | B | B |
| Northern wattled-honeyeater Foulehaio taviunensis* | | B | B | | | | |

== Cuckooshrikes ==
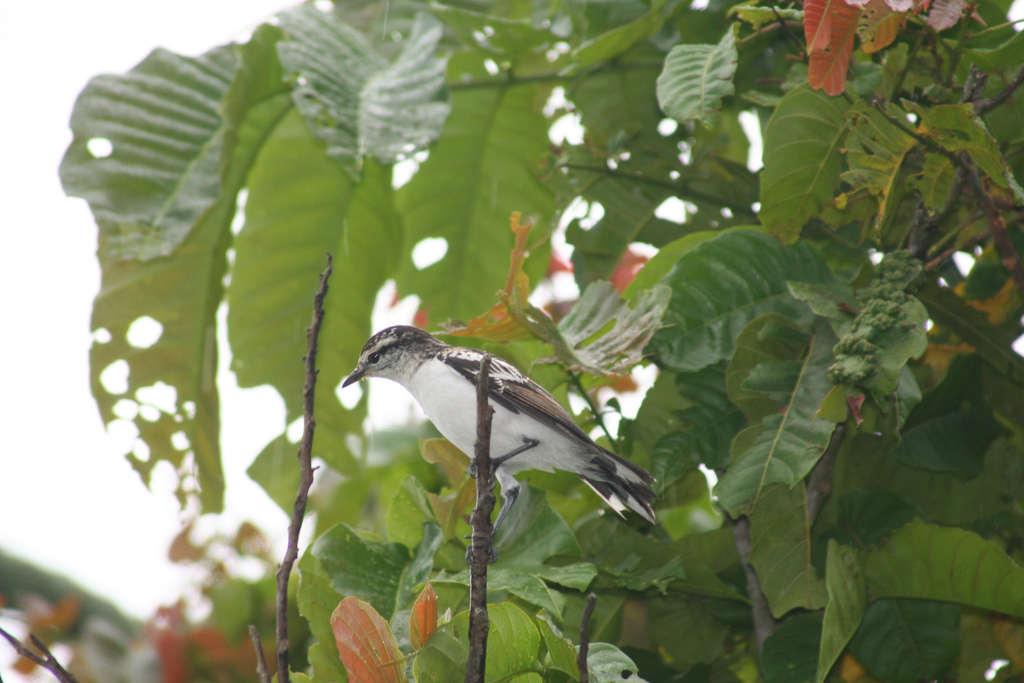
Polynesian triller

Order: Passeriformes Family: Campephagidae

The cuckooshrikes are small to medium-sized passerine birds. They are predominantly greyish with white and black, although some species are brightly coloured.

| Species | Viti Levu | Vanua Levu | Taveuni | Kadavu | Lomaiviti | Lau | Rotuma |
|---|---|---|---|---|---|---|---|
| Polynesian triller Lalage maculosa | B | B | B | B | B | B | B |

== Whistlers and allies ==
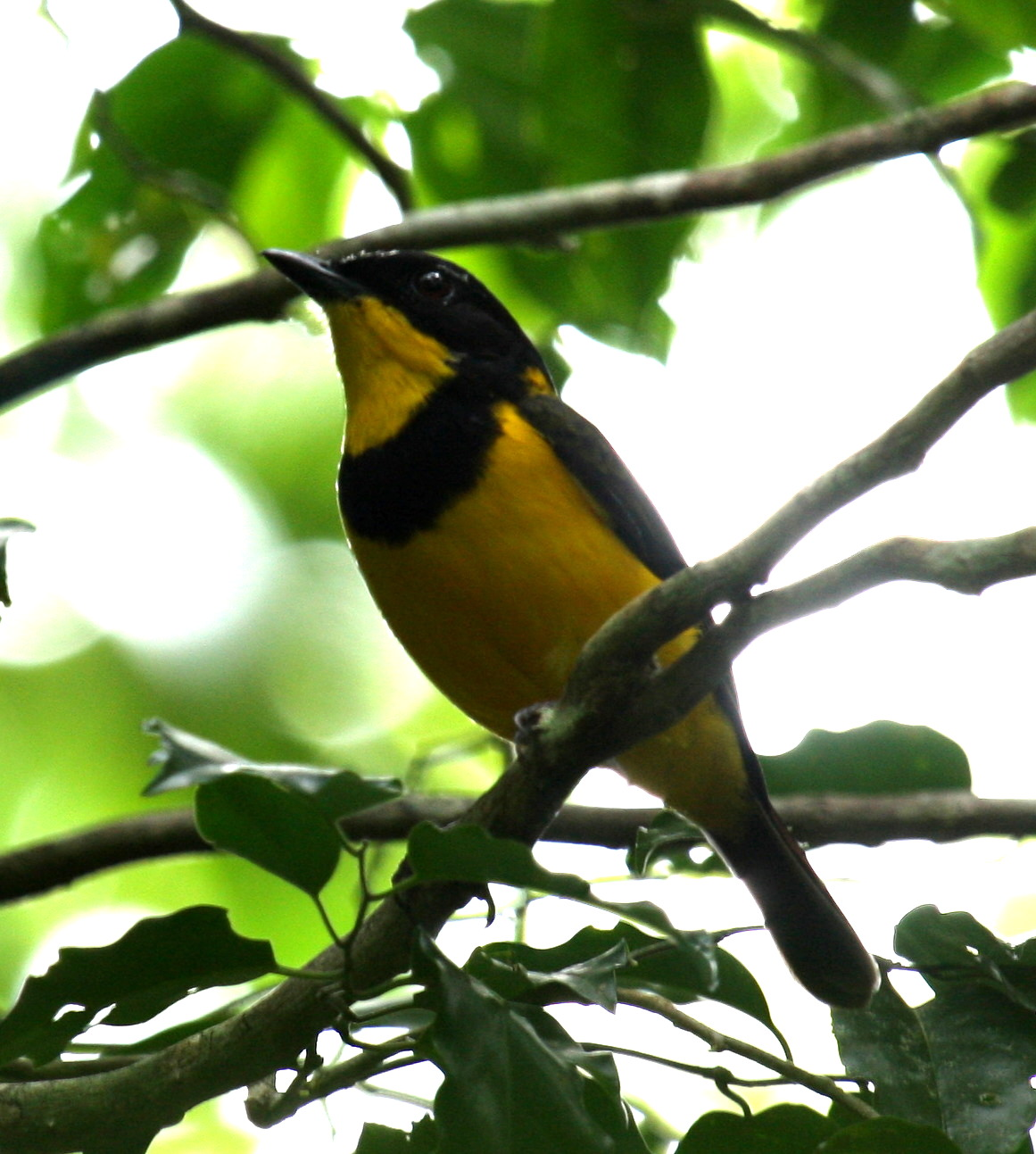
Fiji whistler ssp torquata

Order: Passeriformes Family: Pachycephalidae

The family Pachycephalidae includes the whistlers, shrikethrushes, and some of the pitohuis.

| Species | Viti Levu | Vanua Levu | Taveuni | Kadavu | Lomaiviti | Lau | Rotuma |
|---|---|---|---|---|---|---|---|
| Fiji whistler Pachycephala vitiensis* | B | B | B | B | B | B | |

== Woodswallows, bellmagpies, and allies ==
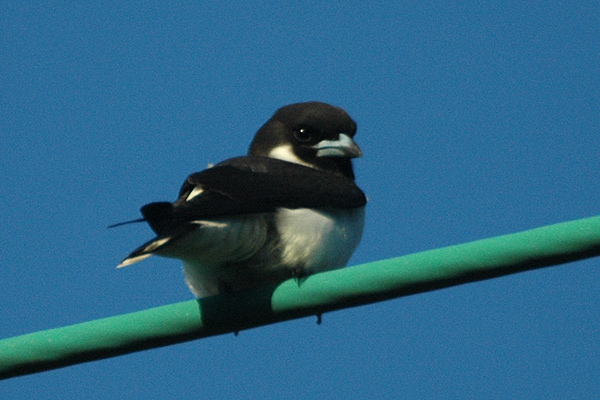
Fiji woodswallow

Order: Passeriformes Family: Artamidae

The woodswallows are soft-plumaged, somber-coloured passerine birds. They are smooth, agile flyers with moderately large, semi-triangular wings. The cracticids: currawongs, bellmagpies and butcherbirds, are similar to the other corvids. They have large, straight bills and mostly black, white or grey plumage. All are omnivorous to some degree.

| Species | Viti Levu | Vanua Levu | Taveuni | Kadavu | Lomaiviti | Lau | Rotuma |
|---|---|---|---|---|---|---|---|
| Fiji woodswallow Artamus mentalis* | B | B | B | | B | | |
| Australian magpie Gymnorhina tibicen | | | I | | | | |

== Fantails ==
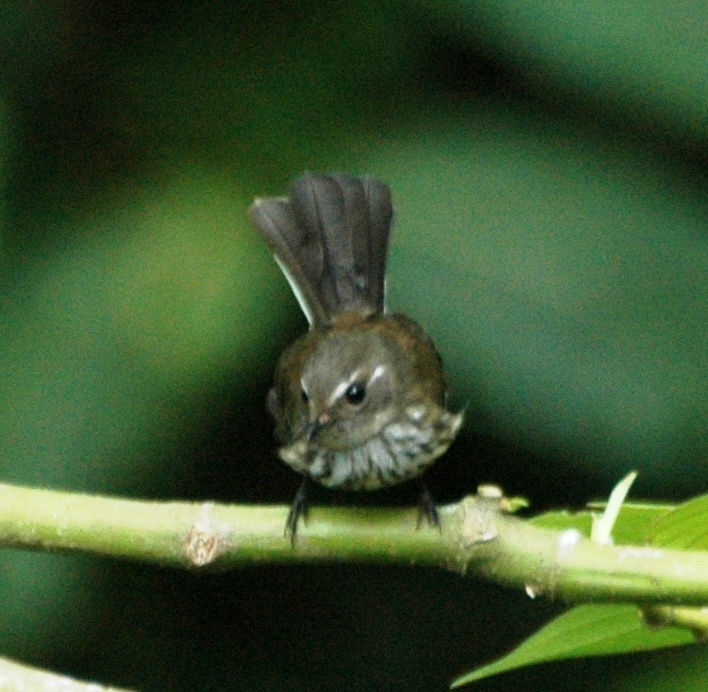
Streaked fantail

Order: Passeriformes Family: Rhipiduridae

The fantails are small insectivorous birds which are specialist aerial feeders.

| Species | Viti Levu | Vanua Levu | Taveuni | Kadavu | Lomaiviti | Lau | Rotuma |
|---|---|---|---|---|---|---|---|
| Taveuni silktail Lamprolia victoriae* | | | B | | | | |
| Natewa silktail Lamprolia klinesmithi* | | B | | | | | |
| Streaked fantail Rhipidura verreauxi | B | B | B | | B | | |
| Kadavu fantail Rhipidura personata* | | | | B | | | |

== Monarch flycatchers ==
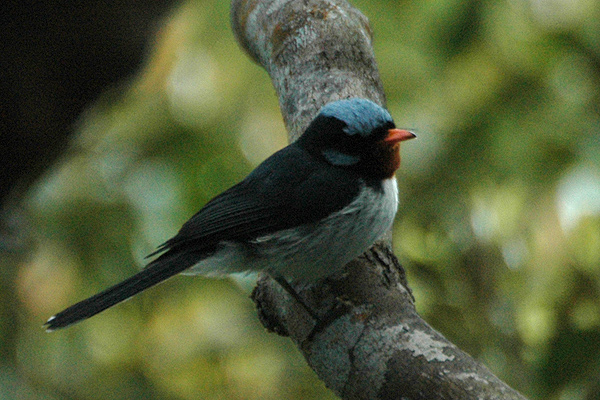
Blue-crested flycatcher

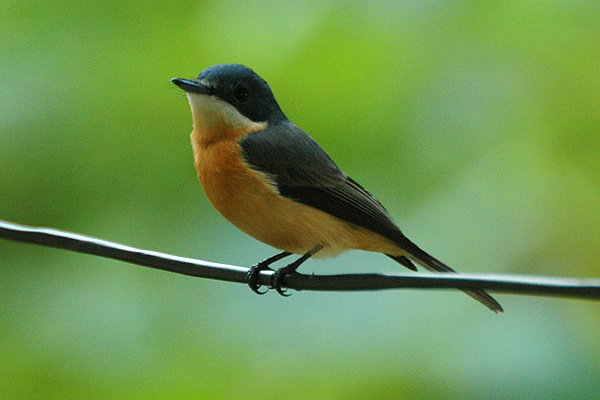
Vanikoro flycatcher

Order: Passeriformes Family: Monarchidae

The monarch flycatchers are small to medium-sized insectivorous passerines which hunt by flycatching.

| Species | Viti Levu | Vanua Levu | Taveuni | Kadavu | Lomaiviti | Lau | Rotuma |
|---|---|---|---|---|---|---|---|
| Ogea monarch Mayrornis versicolor* | | | | | | B | |
| Slaty monarch Mayrornis lessoni* | B | B | B | B | B | B | |
| Fiji shrikebill Clytorhynchus vitiensis | B | B | B | B | B | B | B |
| Black-throated shrikebill Clytorhynchus nigrogularis | B | B | B | B | B | | |
| Vanikoro flycatcher Myiagra vanikorensis | B | B | B | B | B | B | |
| Azure-crested flycatcher Myiagra azureocapilla* | | | B | | | | |
| Chestnut-throated flycatcher Myiagra castaneigularis* | B | B | | | | | |

== Australasian robins ==
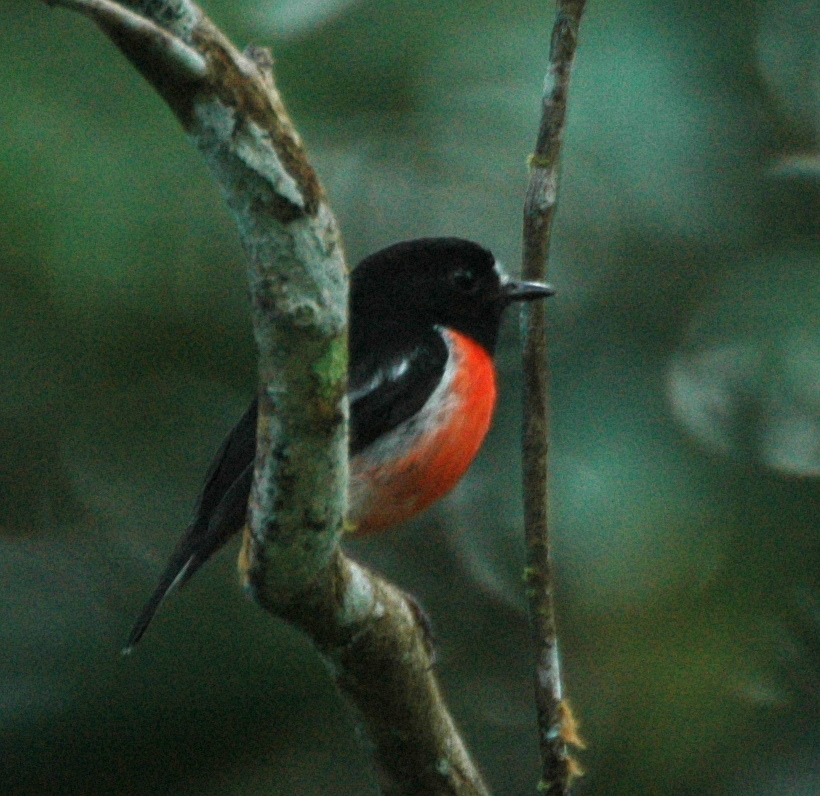
Pacific robin

Order: Passeriformes Family: Petroicidae

Most species of Petroicidae have a stocky build with a large rounded head, a short straight bill and rounded wingtips. They occupy a wide range of wooded habitats, from subalpine to tropical rainforest, and mangrove swamp to semi-arid scrubland. All are primarily insectivores, although a few supplement their diet with seeds.

| Species | Viti Levu | Vanua Levu | Taveuni | Kadavu | Lomaiviti | Lau | Rotuma |
|---|---|---|---|---|---|---|---|
| Pacific robin Petroica pusilla | B | B | B | B | | | |

== Grassbirds and allies ==
Order: Passeriformes Family: Locustellidae

Locustellidae are a family of small insectivorous songbirds found mainly in Eurasia, Africa, and the Australian region. They are smallish birds with tails that are usually long and pointed, and tend to be drab brownish or buffy all over.

| Species | Viti Levu | Vanua Levu | Taveuni | Kadavu | Lomaiviti | Lau | Rotuma |
|---|---|---|---|---|---|---|---|
| Long-legged thicketbird Trichocichla rufa* | B | B | | | | | |

== Swallows ==
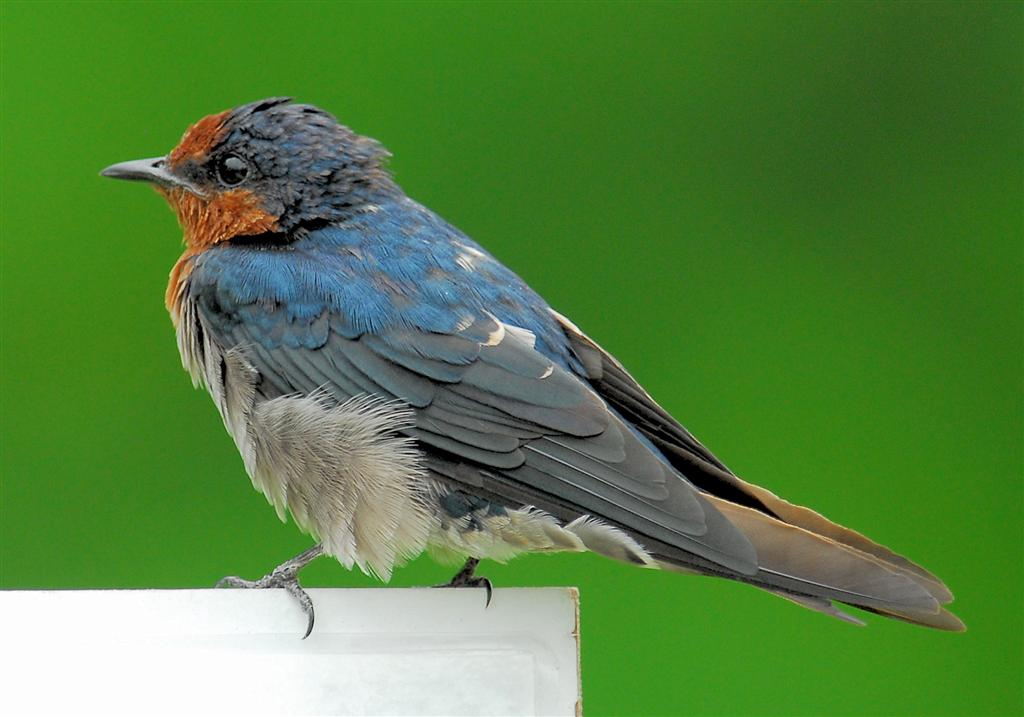
Pacific swallow

Order: Passeriformes Family: Hirundinidae

The family Hirundinidae is adapted to aerial feeding. They have a slender streamlined body, long pointed wings and a short bill with a wide gape. The feet are adapted to perching rather than walking, and the front toes are partially joined at the base.

| Species | Viti Levu | Vanua Levu | Taveuni | Kadavu | Gau | Ovalau | Lau | Rotuma |
|---|---|---|---|---|---|---|---|---|
| Pacific swallow Hirundo tahitica | B | B | B | B | B | B | B | |

== Bulbuls ==
Order: Passeriformes Family: Pycnonotidae

Bulbuls are medium-sized songbirds. Some are colourful with yellow, red or orange vents, cheeks, throats or supercilia, but most are drab, with uniform olive-brown to black plumage. Some species have distinct crests.

| Species | Viti Levu | Vanua Levu | Taveuni | Kadavu | Lomaiviti | Lau | Rotuma |
|---|---|---|---|---|---|---|---|
| Red-vented bulbul Pycnonotus cafer | I | | | | I | | |

== Bush warblers and allies ==
Order: Passeriformes Family: Scotocercidae

The members of this family are found throughout Africa, Asia, and Polynesia. Their taxonomy is in flux, and some authorities place some genera in other families.

| Species | Viti Levu | Vanua Levu | Taveuni | Kadavu | Lomaiviti | Lau | Rotuma |
|---|---|---|---|---|---|---|---|
| Fiji bush warbler Horornis ruficapilla* | B | B | B | B | | | |

== White-eyes, yuhinas, and allies ==
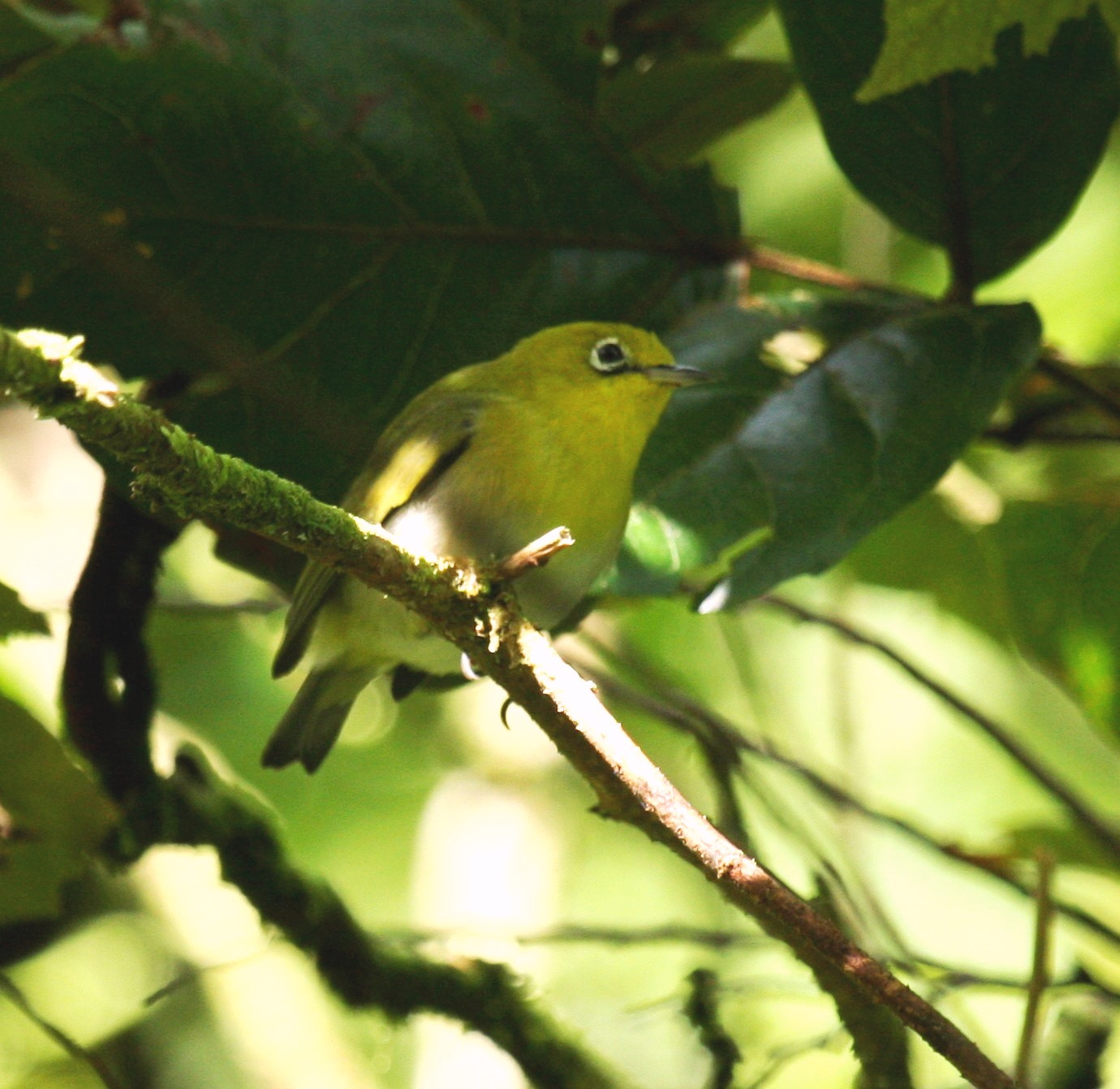
Fiji white-eye

Order: Passeriformes Family: Zosteropidae

The white-eyes are small and mostly undistinguished, their plumage above being generally some dull colour like greenish-olive, but some species have a white or bright yellow throat, breast or lower parts, and several have buff flanks. As their name suggests, many species have a white ring around each eye.

| Species | Viti Levu | Vanua Levu | Taveuni | Kadavu | Lomaiviti | Lau | Rotuma |
|---|---|---|---|---|---|---|---|
| Layard's white-eye Zosterops explorator* | B | B | B | B | B | | |
| Silvereye Zosterops lateralis | B | B | B | B | B | | |
| Yellow-fronted white-eye Zosterops flavifrons | | | | | | | |

== Starlings ==
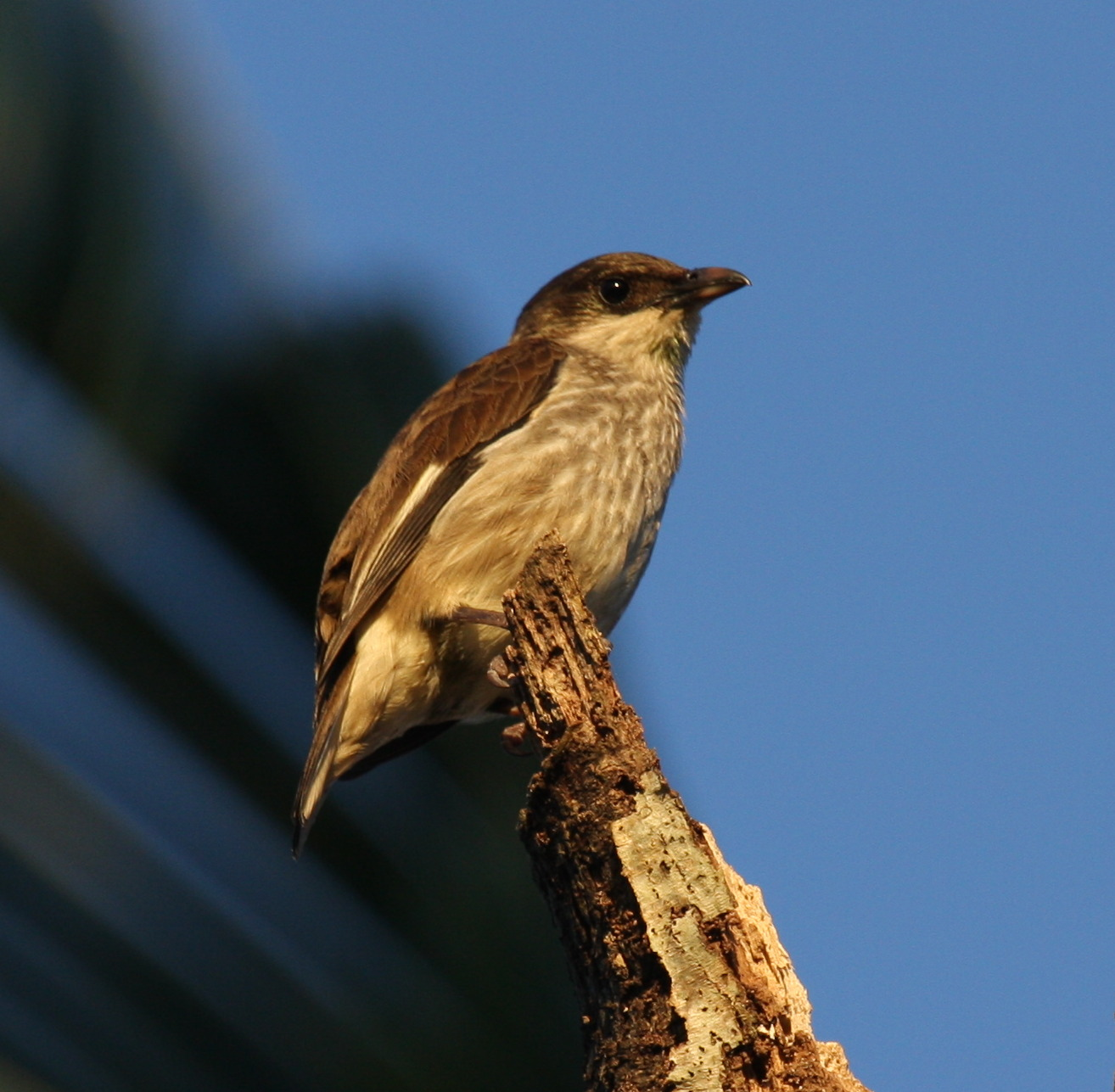
Polynesian starling

Order: Passeriformes Family: Sturnidae

Starlings are small to medium-sized passerine birds. Their flight is strong and direct and they are very gregarious. Their preferred habitat is fairly open country. They eat insects and fruit. Plumage is typically dark with a metallic sheen.

| Species | Viti Levu | Vanua Levu | Taveuni | Kadavu | Lomaiviti | Lau | Rotuma |
|---|---|---|---|---|---|---|---|
| Polynesian starling Aplonis tabuensis | B | B | B | B | B | B | B |
| European starling Sturnus vulgaris | | | | | | I | |
| Common myna Acridotheres tristis | I | I | I | I | I | | |
| Jungle myna Acridotheres fuscus | I | | | | | | |

== Thrushes and allies ==
Order: Passeriformes Family: Turdidae

The thrushes are a group of passerine birds that occur mainly in the Old World. They are plump, soft plumaged, small to medium-sized insectivores or sometimes omnivores, often feeding on the ground. Many have attractive songs.

| Species | Viti Levu | Vanua Levu | Taveuni | Kadavu | Lomaiviti | Lau | Rotuma |
|---|---|---|---|---|---|---|---|
| Fiji island-thrush Turdus ruficeps | B | B | B | B | B | | |

== Waxbills and allies ==
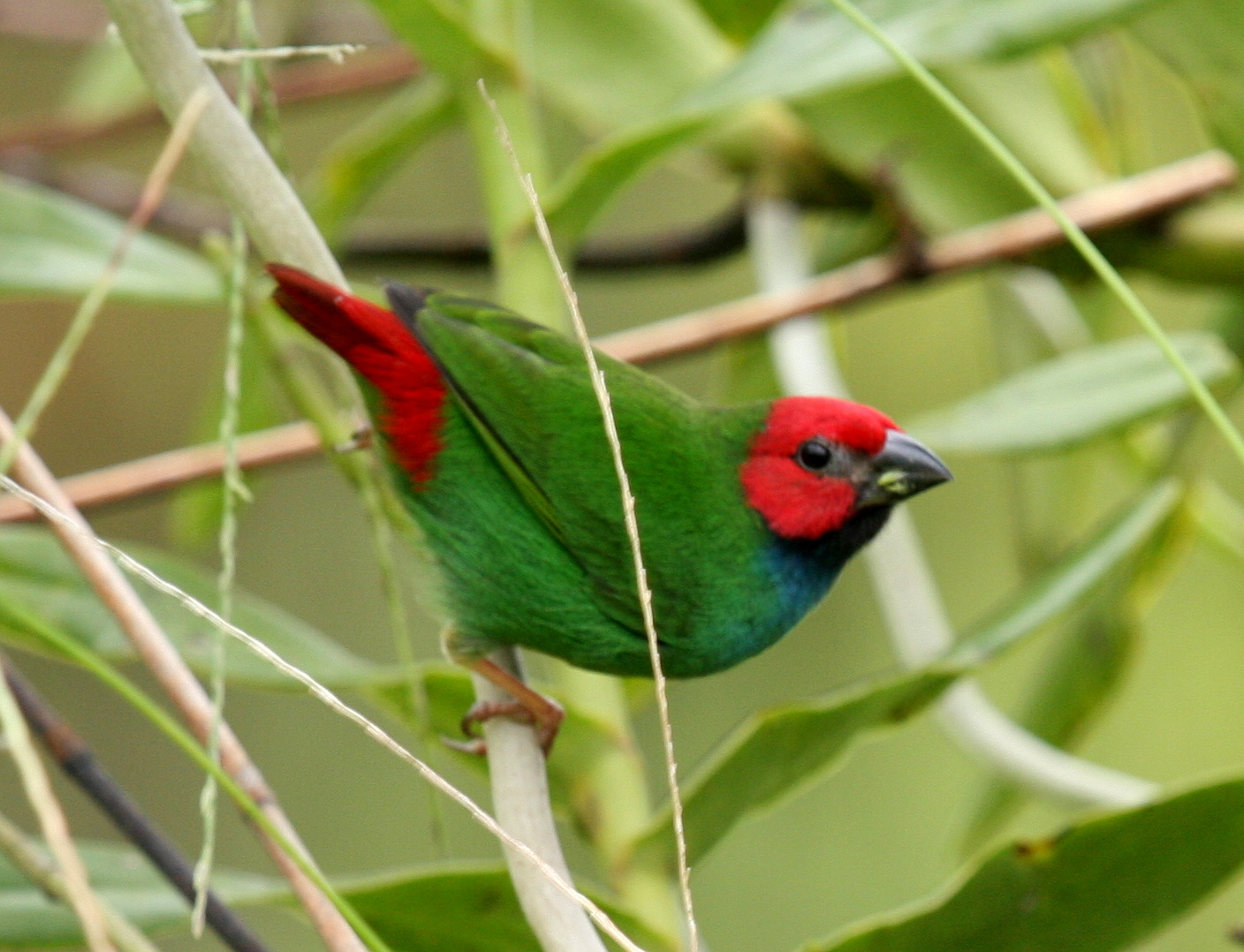
Fiji parrotfinch

Order: Passeriformes Family: Estrildidae

The estrildid finches are small passerine birds of the Old World tropics and Australasia. They are gregarious and often colonial seed eaters with short thick but pointed bills. They are all similar in structure and habits, but have wide variation in plumage colours and patterns.

| Species | Viti Levu | Vanua Levu | Taveuni | Kadavu | Lomaiviti | Lau | Rotuma |
|---|---|---|---|---|---|---|---|
| Red avadavat Amandava amandava | I | I | | | | | |
| Fiji parrotfinch Erythrura pealii | B | B | B | B | | | |
| Pink-billed parrotfinch Erythrura kleinschmidti* | B | | | | | | |
| Java sparrow Padda oryzivora | I | I | I | | | | |

== Old World sparrows ==
Order: Passeriformes Family: Passeridae

Old World sparrows are small passerine birds. In general, sparrows tend to be small, plump, brown or grey birds with short tails and short powerful beaks. Sparrows are seed eaters, but they also consume small insects.

| Species | Viti Levu | Vanua Levu | Taveuni | Kadavu | Lomaiviti | Lau | Rotuma |
|---|---|---|---|---|---|---|---|
| House sparrow Passer domesticus | I | | | | | | |

== See also ==
- List of birds
- Lists of birds by region
