= Slaty flycatcher =

Slaty flycatcher may refer to:

- Vanikoro monarch, a species of flycatcher found in the Solomon Islands
- Slaty monarch, a species of flycatcher found in Fiji
