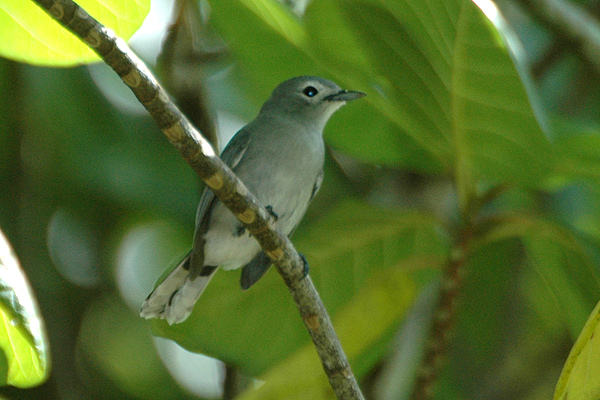
- Slaty monarch (Mayrornis lessoni)

Scientific classification
- Kingdom: Animalia
- Phylum: Chordata
- Class: Aves
- Order: Passeriformes
- Family: Monarchidae
- Genus: Mayrornis; Wetmore, 1932

Type species
- Rhipidura lesson Gray, 1846

= Mayrornis =

Genus of birds

Mayrornis is a genus of bird in the family Monarchidae found in the Solomon Islands and Fiji. The name Mayrornis is a compound word. The first part, Mayr, commemorates Ernst Walter Mayr, a German ornithologist and systematist. The second part, ornis, is the Greek word meaning "bird". Established by Frank Alexander Wetmore in 1932, it contains the following species:

Image	Scientific name	Common name	Distribution
	Mayrornis schistaceus	Vanikoro monarch	Santa Cruz Islands.
	Mayrornis versicolor	Ogea monarch	Ogea Driki and Ogea Levu
	Mayrornis lessoni	Slaty monarch	Fiji.
