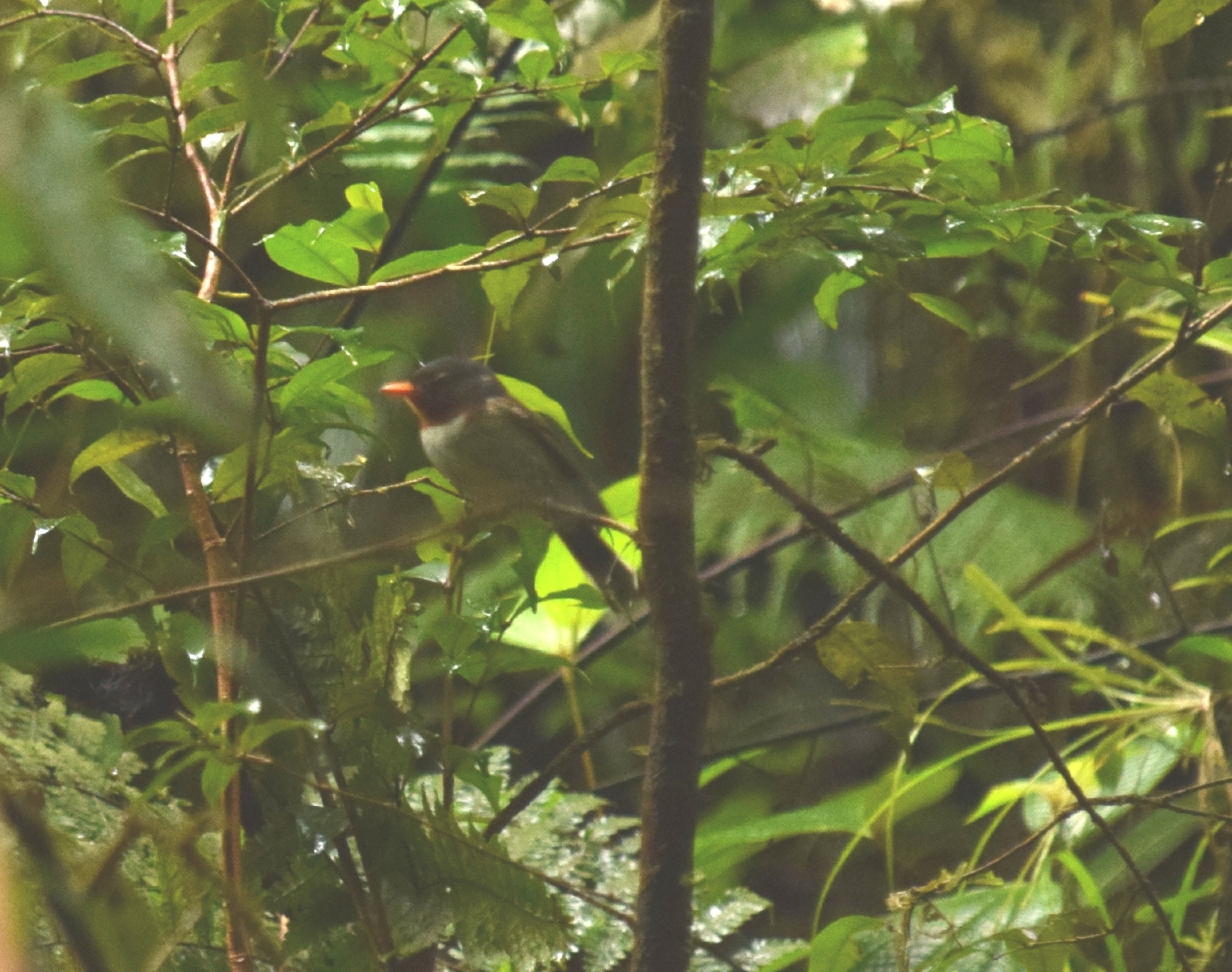

Conservation status
- Least Concern (IUCN 3.1)

Scientific classification
- Kingdom: Animalia
- Phylum: Chordata
- Class: Aves
- Order: Passeriformes
- Family: Monarchidae
- Genus: Myiagra
- Species: M. castaneigularis

Binomial name
- Myiagra castaneigularis Layard, 1876

Subspecies
- See text

= Chestnut-throated flycatcher =

Species of bird

The chestnut-throated flycatcher (Myiagra castaneigularis) is a species of bird in the monarch-flycatcher family Monarchidae. The species is endemic to Fiji.

== Taxonomy and systematics ==
In 2016, the chestnut-throated flycatcher was recognized as a new species after being split from the azure-crested flycatcher.

=== Subspecies ===
Two subspecies are recognized:

- M. c. castaneigularis - Layard, 1876: Found on Vanua Levu (northern Fiji)
- M. c. whitneyi - Mayr, 1933: Found on Viti Levu (western Fiji)
