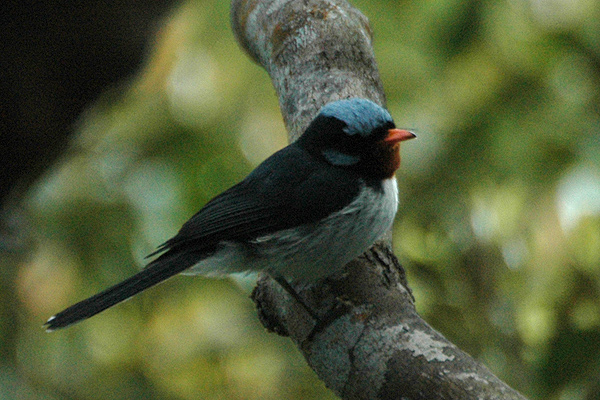

Conservation status
- Near Threatened (IUCN 3.1)

Scientific classification
- Kingdom: Animalia
- Phylum: Chordata
- Class: Aves
- Order: Passeriformes
- Family: Monarchidae
- Genus: Myiagra
- Species: M. azureocapilla

Binomial name
- Myiagra azureocapilla Layard, 1875

= Azure-crested flycatcher =

Species of bird

The azure-crested flycatcher (Myiagra azureocapilla) or the blue-crested flycatcher, is a species of bird in the monarch flycatcher family Monarchidae. It is endemic to Fiji, where it is found on Taveuni.

Its natural habitats are subtropical or tropical moist lowland forests and subtropical or tropical moist montane forests.

== Taxonomy ==
The azure-crested flycatcher was first described in 1875 by ornithologist Edgar Leopold Layard, Administrator of the Government of the Colony of Fiji at the time. Its specific epithet is derived from the Latin azureus 'blue', and capillus 'of the head'. It is also commonly known as the blue-crested broadbill, or the azure-crested flycatcher.

It is a member of a group of birds termed monarch flycatchers. This group is considered either as a subfamily Monarchinae, together with the fantails as part of the drongo family Dicruridae, or as a family Monarchidae in its own right. They are not closely related to their namesakes either, the Old World flycatchers of the family Muscicapidae; early molecular research in the late 1980s and early 1990s revealed the monarchs belong to a large group of mainly Australasian birds known as the Corvida parvorder comprising many tropical and Australian passerines. More recently, the grouping has been refined somewhat as the monarchs have been classified in a 'Core corvine' group with the crows and ravens, shrikes, birds of paradise, fantails, drongos and mudnest builders.

In 2016, two former subspecies of the azure-crested flycatcher were reclassified as a separate species, the chestnut-throated flycatcher.

== Description ==
Measuring 14 cm (5.5 in) in length, the azure-crested Flycatcher is sexually dimorphic. The male has light blue crown with slate-blue upperparts, and white underparts. The female in brown above with greyish tinged cheeks and bluish tinged crown. Unusually for the genus Myiagra the bill is bright orange instead of black.

== Gallery ==
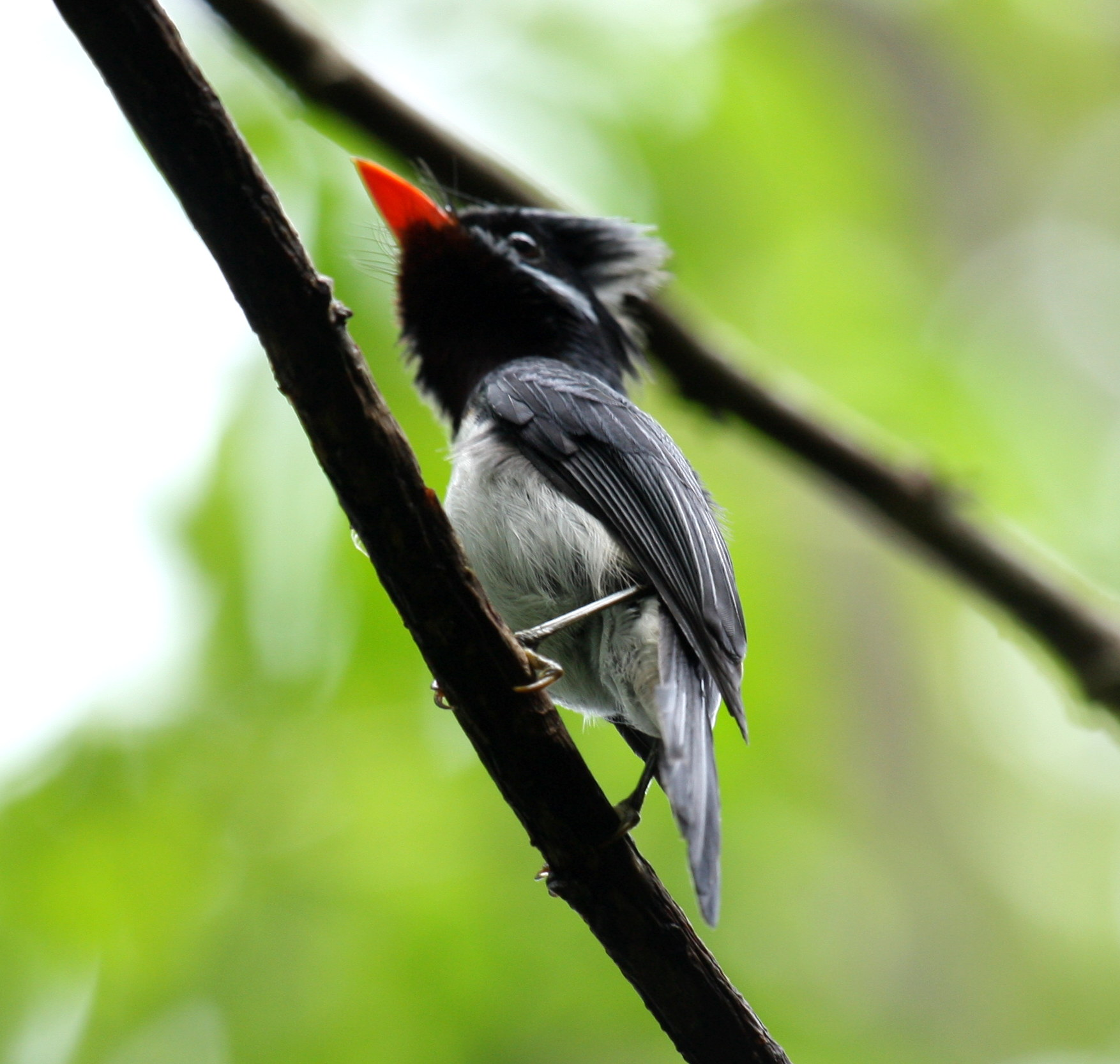
Male in threat-posture, Vidawa, Taveuni, Fiji Isles
