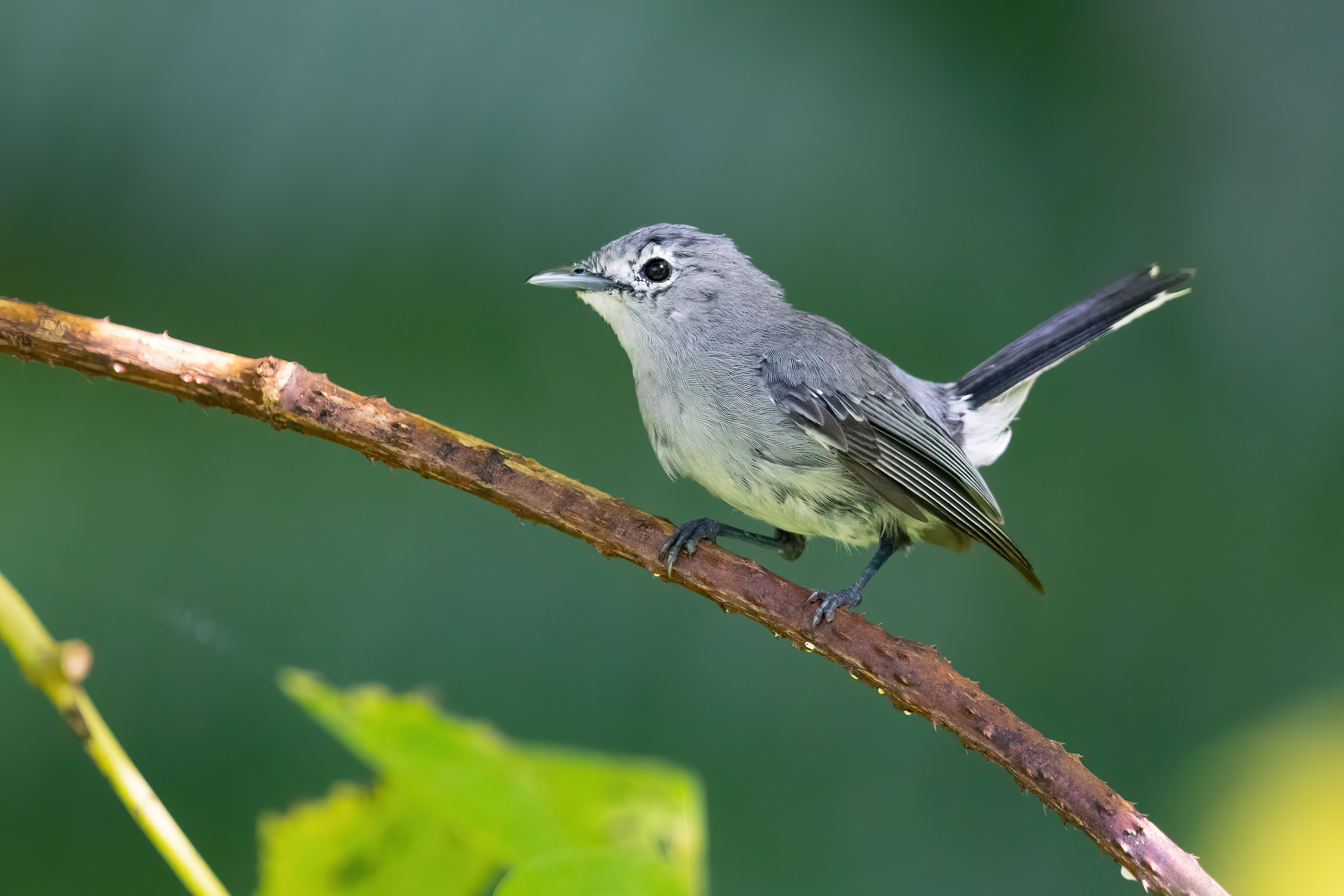

Conservation status
- Least Concern (IUCN 3.1)

Scientific classification
- Kingdom: Animalia
- Phylum: Chordata
- Class: Aves
- Order: Passeriformes
- Family: Monarchidae
- Genus: Mayrornis
- Species: M. lessoni

Binomial name
- Mayrornis lessoni (G.R. Gray, 1846)

Subspecies
- See text

Synonyms
- Rhipidura Lessoni

= Slaty monarch =

Species of bird

The slaty monarch (Mayrornis lessoni) is a species of bird in the family Monarchidae endemic to Fiji. Its natural habitat is subtropical or tropical moist lowland forests.

== Taxonomy and systematics ==
The slaty monarch was originally described in the genus Rhipidura. Alternate names include cinereous flycatcher, Fiji flycatcher, Fiji slaty flycatcher, slaty flycatcher (an alternate name shared with the Vanikoro monarch) and white-tipped slaty flycatcher.

=== Subspecies ===
There are two subspecies recognized:

- M. l. lessoni - (G.R. Gray, 1846): found in western and central Fiji Islands
- M. l. orientalis - Mayr, 1933: found in eastern Fiji Islands
