= Vanikoro monarch =

Conservation status
- Vulnerable (IUCN 3.1)

Scientific classification
- Kingdom: Animalia
- Phylum: Chordata
- Class: Aves
- Order: Passeriformes
- Family: Monarchidae
- Genus: Mayrornis
- Species: M. schistaceus

Binomial name
- Mayrornis schistaceus Mayr, 1933

Species of bird

The Vanikoro monarch (Mayrornis schistaceus) is a species of bird in the monarch family, Monarchidae, endemic to the Solomon Islands. Its natural habitat is subtropical or tropical moist lowland forests and it is threatened by habitat loss.

== Etymology ==
The genus name, Mayrornis, is an honorific to Ernst Walter Mayr (1904–2005), a German ornithologist and systematist.

The specific epithet, schistaceus, comes from Latin schistaceus, meaning "slate-grey", which is derived from schistus, "slate", which is then derived from lapis schistos, "fissile stone". Lapis schistos is derived from the Ancient Greek σχιστος (skhistos), meaning "cloven", which is derived from σχιζω (skhizō), "to split".

== Habitat and ecology ==
Endemic to Vanikoro and its satellite island, Teanu, in the Solomon Islands, the Vanikoro monarch has an extent of occurrence and area of occupancy of 316 km^{2} (122 sq mi) at 0–450 m (0–1,476 ft) above sea level. Their main habitat is subtropical to tropical moist lowland forests.

The mature population was 2,500–4,000 individuals at a predicted density of around 36 individuals per 1 km^{2} (0.39 sq mi) as of 2023. Due to forest loss, the Vanikoro monarch is classified as vulnerable, and it is predicted that the population size is decreasing.

They are non-migratory.

Their trophic level is that of a carnivore, while their trophic niche is that of an invertivore (invertebrate-eater). They reach reproductive age at 1.1 years and, on average, live to 2.7 years, though some specimens have lived to 8 years old.

== Description ==
The dominant colors of the Vanikoro monarch are grey, black, and white, with smaller amounts of brown, blue, and beige. While mostly slate-grey, they have a white eye-ring and undertail.

From beak-tip to tail-tip, the measure 13–14 cm (5.1–5.5 in). The weigh 15.7 g (0.55 oz). Their wingspan is 13.92 cm (5.48 in). The length of their legs is 2.05 cm (0.81 in). Their beak is 0.99 cm (0.39 in) long, with width and height being 0.46 cm (0.18 in) and 0.43 cm (0.17 in), respectively.
