= Fiji tropical moist forests =

Terrestrial ecoregion in Fiji and Wallis and Futuna

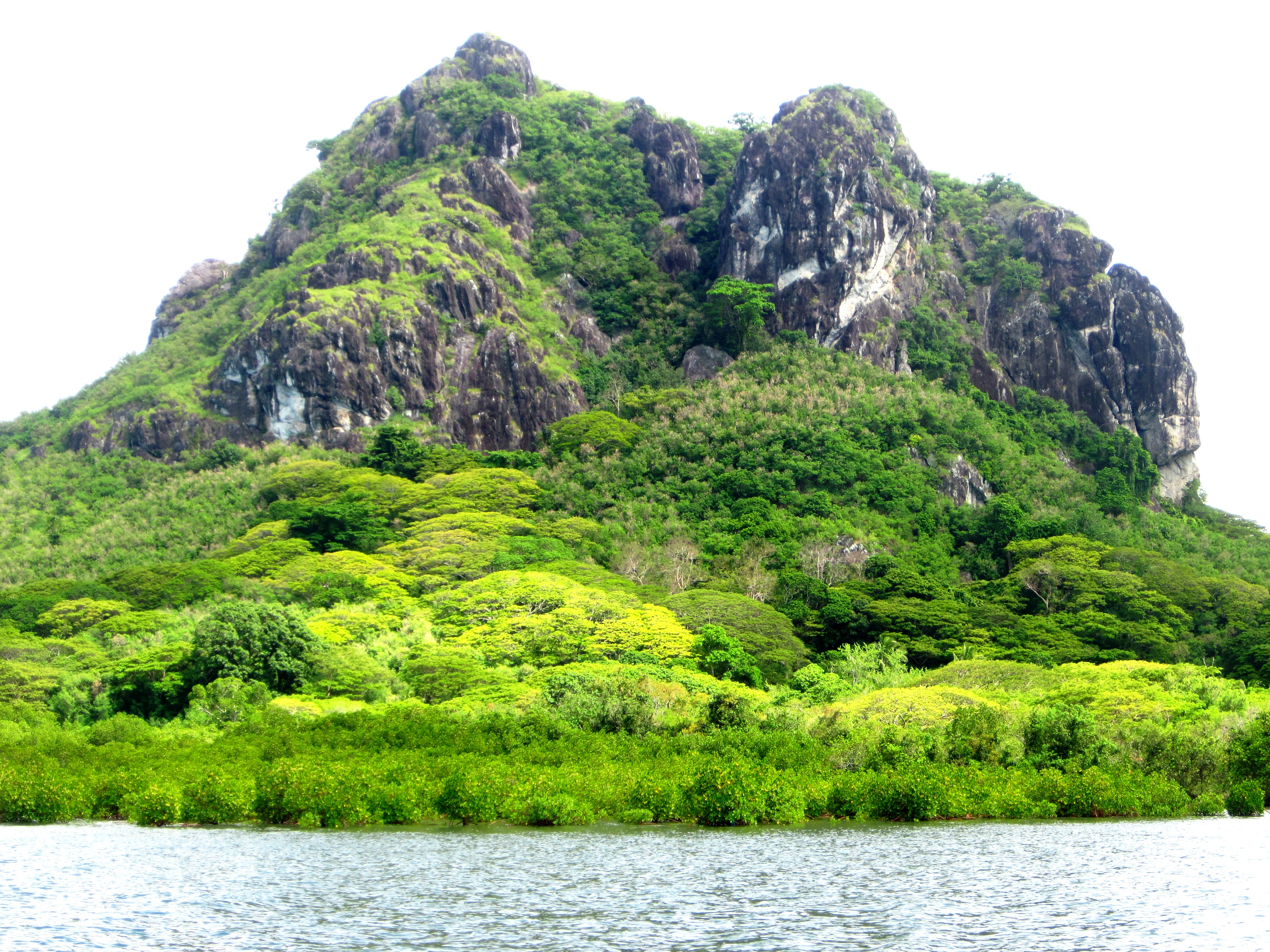
- Navatu Rock on Vanua Levu, Fiji

- Location of the Fiji tropical moist forests (OC0105) in the Fijian islands.

Ecology
- Realm: Oceanian
- Biome: tropical and subtropical moist broadleaf forests
- Borders: Fiji tropical dry forests

Geography
- Area: 10,088 km^{2} (3,895 mi^{2})
- Countries: Fiji; Wallis and Futuna (Overseas territory of France)

Conservation
- Conservation status: Critical/endangered
- Protected: 598 km^{2} (6%)

The Fiji tropical moist forests is a tropical moist forest ecoregion in Fiji and Wallis and Futuna. It covers the windward sides of Viti Levu and Vanua Levu, Fiji's largest islands, as well as the smaller Fijian islands and the three islands that make up Wallis and Futuna, an overseas territory of France. The drier leeward sides of Viti Levu and Vanua Levu are home to the distinct Fiji tropical dry forests ecoregion.

== Geography ==
Fiji has more than 300 islands. Viti Levu and Vanua Levu are the largest, and together comprise 78% of Fiji's land area. The highest peak in Fiji is Mount Tomanivi (1,324 m) on Viti Levu. The islands are volcanic in origin, formed by the subduction of the Pacific Plate under the Australian Plate. The islands emerged from the sea 5 to 20 million years ago.

Wallis and Futuna is made up of three islands, Uvea, Futuna, and Alofi. Futuna and Alofi lie close to one another, approximately 400 km northeast of Vanua Levu. Uvea, or Wallis, is northeast of Futuna and Alofi. The highest peak in the group is Mount Singavi (765 m) on Futuna.

Rotuma is a volcanic island 500 km north of Viti Levu and politically part of Fiji. It has an area of 47 km^{2}, and the highest elevation on the island is 250 metres.

== Climate ==
The ecoregion has a humid tropical climate. Mean monthly temperatures range from 22 to 26 °C (72 to 79 °F) in January. Rainfall occurs throughout the year, and the prevailing winds are mostly from the southeast. Most of the ecoregion receives over 2,500 mm (98 in) of rain per year. Rainfall is higher on southeast-facing slopes, and the windward mountains receive 5000–10,000 mm of rainfall per year. The islands occasionally experience Tropical cyclones between January and April.

The northwestern portions of Viti Levu and Vanua Levu are in the mountains' rain shadow, and receive less rain overall with a winter dry season. These areas are home to the Fiji tropical dry forests ecoregion.

== Flora ==
The three main plant communities in the ecoregion are lowland rain forest, montane rain forest, and cloud forest.

Lowland rain forest predominates below 400 meters elevation on all the smaller islands, and in the southeast-facing lowlands of Viti Levu and Vanua Levu. Common trees include Degeneria vitiensis, Pandanus joskei, Myristica macrantha, Endiandra gillespiei, Agathis macrophylla, Calophyllum vitiense, Canarium vitiense, Calophyllum neo-ebudicum, Syzygium spp., and Garcinia myrtifolia. Other lowland forest trees in Wallis and Futuna include Rhus taitensis, Elaeocarpus angustifolius, Elaeocarpus tonganus, Planchonella spp., Pometia pinnata, and Myristica inutilis.

Montane rain forests are found on windy slopes from 400 to 600 meters elevation. Temperatures are 4 to 6 °C cooler than in the coastal lowlands. The windy conditions creates a low, stunted forest characterized by the trees Agathis vitiensis, Podocarpus spp., Calophyllum vitiense, Endospermum macrophyllum, Myristica castaneifolia, Didymocheton spp., and Metrosideros vitiensis.

The cloud forests occur between 600 and 900 meters elevation on the larger Fijian islands and on Futuna. Rainfall is higher than the lowlands, exceeding 4500 mm per year in most areas. Temperatures are cooler, ranging from 10 to 20 °C. The cloud forest trees form a dense canopy about seven meters high. Common trees include tree ferns (Cyathea spp.), Epicharis gillespieana, Hernandia moerenhoutiana, Fagraea spp., Syzygium spp., and Macaranga seemannii. Leptopteris ferns and the climbers Freycinetia spp. are abundant.

1,769 vascular plants are native to Fiji, of which 1,350 are native to moist forests. About 23% of Fiji's native plants are endemic. Fiji has one endemic plant family, Degeneriaceae, which includes two species of trees distantly related to magnolias. Two monotypic genera, Gillespiea and Hedstromia in family Rubiaceae, are endemic to Fiji. There are 24 native species of palms, mostly endemic. There are 10 native species of gymnosperms, including the Fijian endemics Acmopyle sahniana (Viti Levu), Dacrydium nausoriense (western Viti Levu), Podocarpus affinis (Viti Levu), Podocarpus decipiens (Viti Levu), and Podocarpus degeneri (Viti Levu and Vanua Levu).

== Fauna ==
The ancestors of Fiji's land animals arrived via long-distance dispersal. There are many endemic species, and some are limited to one or two islands.

Fiji has 177 species of birds, including 31 endemic species. The islands have four endemic doves, the orange fruit dove (Ptilinopus victor), golden fruit dove (P. luteovirens), whistling fruit dove (P. layardi), and Barking imperial pigeon (Ducula latrans). The collared lory (Phigys solitarius), red-throated lorikeet (Charmosyna amabilis), and masked shining parrot (Prosopeia personata), are endemic; the red shining parrot (Prosopeia tabuensis) is a Fijian endemic that was introduced to Tonga in ancient times. The bar-winged rail (Rallus poecilopterus) is endemic to Viti Levu and Vanua Levu, and may be extinct.

The silktails (Lamprolia) are a Fijian endemic genus with two species – the Taveuni silktail (Lamprolia victoriae) is limited to Taveuni, and the Natewa silktail (Lamprolia klinesmithi) to Vanua Levu. The long-legged warbler (Cincloramphus rufus) and pink-billed parrotfinch (Erythrura kleinschmidti) are also endemic.

Bats are the only native terrestrial mammals in the ecoregion. The Fijian monkey-faced bat (Pteralopex acrodonta) is endemic, and the Fijian mastiff bat (Chaerephon bregullae) is found in the Fijian Islands and Vanuatu.

Endemic reptiles include the Fiji crested iguana (Brachylophus vitiensis), Lau banded iguana (Brachylophus fasciatus), and Fiji snake (Ogmodon vitianus).

The endemic Fiji ground frog (Cornufer vitianus) and Fiji tree frog (Platymantis vitiensis) are the easternmost native amphibians in the Oceanian realm.

== Protected areas ==
A 2017 assessment found that 598 km^{2}, or 6%, of the ecoregion is in protected areas. Protected areas include Sovi Basin Protected Area (20.0 km^{2}), Nadarivatu Forest Reserve, Tomaniivi Nature Reserve (11.04 km^{2}), and Colo-i-suva Forest Reserve (4.97 km^{2}) on Viti Levu, and the contiguous Ravilevu Nature Reserve (40.2 km^{2}) and Bouma Lavena Recreation Reserve (37.69 km^{2}) on Taveuni.
