= Metrosideros vitiensis =

Scientific classification
- Kingdom: Plantae
- Clade: Tracheophytes
- Clade: Angiosperms
- Clade: Eudicots
- Clade: Rosids
- Order: Myrtales
- Family: Myrtaceae
- Genus: Metrosideros
- Species: M. vitiensis

Binomial name
- Metrosideros vitiensis (A.Gray) Villon (2015)

Synonyms
- Metrosideros collina var. vitiensis A.Gray (1854); Metrosideros collina var. fruticosa J.W.Moore (1963); Tristania vitiensis A.C.Sm. (1936)

Species of flowering plant

Metrosideros vitiensis is a species of flowering plant in the family Myrtaceae. It is a shrub or tree native to Vanuatu, Fiji, and the Samoan Islands.

== Taxonomy ==
Metrosideros vitiensis was formerly included within M. collina. A phylogenetic study, published in 2015 by Pillon et al., found that M. collina comprised two genetically distinct groups. The populations in Vanuatu, Fiji, and the Samoan Islands were recognized as a distinct species, M. vitiensis, while the populations in the Cook Islands, French Polynesia, and Pitcairn Islands remained in M. collina.

== Habitat ==
On the larger Fijian islands, Metrosideros vitiensis is a characteristic tree in montane rain forests on windy slopes from 400 to 600 meters elevation. It is a common canopy tree in the low, stunted forest, with the associated trees Agathis vitiensis, Podocarpus spp., Calophyllum vitiense, Endospermum macrophyllum, Myristica castaneifolia, and Didymocheton spp.

In the Samoan Islands, M. vitiensis is a common tree on upland lava flows.
