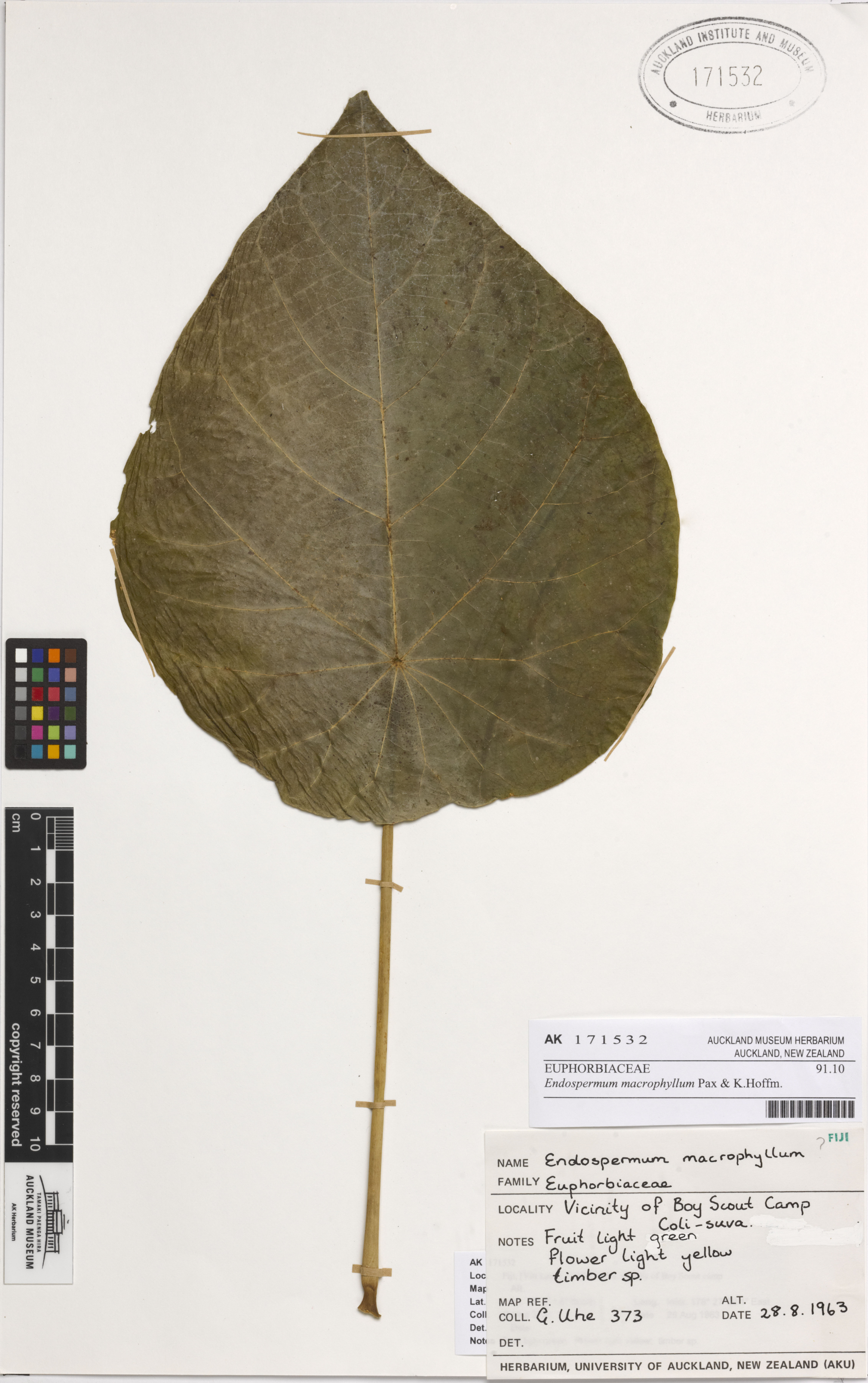

Conservation status
- Least Concern (IUCN 3.1)

Scientific classification
- Kingdom: Plantae
- Clade: Embryophytes
- Clade: Tracheophytes
- Clade: Spermatophytes
- Clade: Angiosperms
- Clade: Eudicots
- Clade: Rosids
- Order: Malpighiales
- Family: Euphorbiaceae
- Genus: Endospermum
- Species: E. macrophyllum

Binomial name
- Endospermum macrophyllum (Müll.Arg.) Pax & K.Hoffm. (1914)

Synonyms
- Macaranga macrophylla Müll.Arg. (1866); Mappa macrophylla A.Gray ex Seem. (1861), nom. nud.; Tanarius macrophyllus (Müll.Arg.) Kuntze (1891)

= Endospermum macrophyllum =

Species of flowering plant

Endospermum macrophyllum is a species of flowering plant in the family Euphorbiaceae. It is a tree endemic to Fiji, where it grows in tropical moist forests.

== Description ==
Endospermum macrophyllum is a small tree, growing to 15 metres in height, with flowers and fruits observed throughout the year.

== Habitat ==
Endospermum macrophyllum grows in dense forests from sea level to 900 metres elevation, where it is locally abundant. It is a characteristic canopy tree of montane rain forests on windy slopes from 400 to 600 meters elevation. These forests are 4 to 6 °C cooler than the coastal lowlands, and the windy conditions create a low, stunted forest. Other characteristic trees are Agathis vitiensis, Podocarpus spp., Calophyllum vitiense, Myristica castaneifolia, Didymocheton spp., and Metrosideros vitiensis.

In the coastal lowlands it grows in thickets near mangrove swamps.

== Uses and conservation ==
Endospermum macrophyllum is harvested for its timber, which is used for construction and more frequently for banana crates.

Although it is harvested for timber, the species is generally abundant and there are protections in place to prevent its decline, so the IUCN does not consider it threatened. The species is subject to Fiji's Endangered and Protected Species Act (2002), and a quota is placed on export of its timber. There are also government efforts to replant the species.
