= Astronidium pallidiflorum =

Conservation status
- Critically Endangered (IUCN 3.1)

Scientific classification
- Kingdom: Plantae
- Clade: Tracheophytes
- Clade: Angiosperms
- Clade: Eudicots
- Clade: Rosids
- Order: Myrtales
- Family: Melastomataceae
- Genus: Astronidium
- Species: A. pallidiflorum

Binomial name
- Astronidium pallidiflorum A.C.Sm.

Species of flowering plant

Astronidium pallidiflorum is a species of plant in the family Melastomataceae. It is a tree which grows up to 15 metres tall and is endemic to Fiji. It is known from a single location on Viti Levu, where it grows in dense lowland rain forest from 50 to 150 metres elevation.

The species was first described by Albert Charles Smith in 1967.
