= A. robustum =

A. robustum may refer to:

- Achnatherum robustum, the sleepy grass, a perennial plant species found on dry soil in the American Midwest
- Astronidium robustum, a plant species endemic to Fiji
