= Astronidium macranthum =

Conservation status
- Endangered (IUCN 3.1)

Scientific classification
- Kingdom: Plantae
- Clade: Tracheophytes
- Clade: Angiosperms
- Clade: Eudicots
- Clade: Rosids
- Order: Myrtales
- Family: Melastomataceae
- Genus: Astronidium
- Species: A. macranthum

Binomial name
- Astronidium macranthum (A.C.Sm.) A.C.Sm.

Synonyms
- Astronia macrantha A.C.Sm.

Species of flowering plant

Astronidium macranthum is a species of flowering plant in the family Melastomataceae. It is a shrub or small tree endemic to Fiji. It grows in dry forest and along forest edges on Viti Levu and Vanua Levu from 50 to 600 metres elevation.

The species was first described as Astronia macrantha by Albert Charles Smith in 1936. In 1942 Smith placed the species in genus Astronidium as A. macranthum.
