= Astronidium ovalifolium =

Conservation status
- Data Deficient (IUCN 3.1)

Scientific classification
- Kingdom: Plantae
- Clade: Embryophytes
- Clade: Tracheophytes
- Clade: Spermatophytes
- Clade: Angiosperms
- Clade: Eudicots
- Clade: Rosids
- Order: Myrtales
- Family: Melastomataceae
- Genus: Astronidium
- Species: A. ovalifolium

Binomial name
- Astronidium ovalifolium (Naudin) J.R.Maxwell

Synonyms
- Astronia ovalifolia Naudin (1846); Naudinia ovalifolia Decne. ex Triana; Pharmacum ovalifolium Kuntze

Species of flowering plant

Astronidium ovalifolium is a species of flowering plant in the family Melastomataceae. It is a shrub or small tree, which grows from 1.5 to 6 meters in height. It is endemic to the islands of Tahiti and Raiatea in the Society Islands of French Polynesia. It grows in dry forests or in forest edges from 50 to 600 meters elevation.
