= Astronidium storckii =

Conservation status
- Least Concern (IUCN 3.1)

Scientific classification
- Kingdom: Plantae
- Clade: Tracheophytes
- Clade: Angiosperms
- Clade: Eudicots
- Clade: Rosids
- Order: Myrtales
- Family: Melastomataceae
- Genus: Astronidium
- Species: A. storckii

Binomial name
- Astronidium storckii Seem.

Synonyms
- Astronia storckii Triana; Pharmacum storckii Kuntze

Species of flowering plant

Astronidium storckii is a species of plant in the family Melastomataceae. It is a small tree, 4 to 10 metres tall, which is endemic to Fiji. It is native to the islands of Viti Levu and Ovalau. It grows in dense rain forests and thickets on crests and ridges from 30 to 1,153 metres elevation.

The species was first described by Berthold Carl Seemann in 1866.
