= Astronidium lepidotum =

Conservation status
- Critically Endangered (IUCN 3.1)

Scientific classification
- Kingdom: Plantae
- Clade: Tracheophytes
- Clade: Angiosperms
- Clade: Eudicots
- Clade: Rosids
- Order: Myrtales
- Family: Melastomataceae
- Genus: Astronidium
- Species: A. lepidotum

Binomial name
- Astronidium lepidotum A.C.Sm.

Species of flowering plant

Astronidium lepidotum is a species of plant in the family Melastomataceae. It is a small tree endemic to Fiji. It is known from two collections in lowland rain forest on Viti Levu below 200 meters elevation. The forest where it was collected is now gone, and the species hasn't been seen since 1964 and may be extinct.
