= Astronidium victoriae =

Conservation status
- Least Concern (IUCN 3.1)

Scientific classification
- Kingdom: Plantae
- Clade: Tracheophytes
- Clade: Angiosperms
- Clade: Eudicots
- Clade: Rosids
- Order: Myrtales
- Family: Melastomataceae
- Genus: Astronidium
- Species: A. victoriae

Binomial name
- Astronidium victoriae (Gillespie) A.C.Sm.

Synonyms
- Astronia victoriae Gillespie

Species of flowering plant

Astronidium victoriae is a species of plant in the family Melastomataceae. It is endemic to Fiji, where it is native to the islands of Viti Levu, Ovalau, and Moala. It is a shrub or small tree of (2–) 3–12 metres tall. It grows in dense or open lowland and montane rain forest or thicket from 100 to 1,323 metres elevation.

The species was first described as Astronia victoriae by John Wynn Gillespie in 1931. In 1942 Albert Charles Smith placed the species in genus Astronidium as A. victoriae.
