= Astronidium saulae =

Conservation status
- Data Deficient (IUCN 3.1)

Scientific classification
- Kingdom: Plantae
- Clade: Embryophytes
- Clade: Tracheophytes
- Clade: Spermatophytes
- Clade: Angiosperms
- Clade: Eudicots
- Clade: Rosids
- Order: Myrtales
- Family: Melastomataceae
- Genus: Astronidium
- Species: A. saulae

Binomial name
- Astronidium saulae A.C.Sm.

Species of flowering plant

Astronidium saulae is a species of flowering plant in the family Melastomataceae. It is a slender tree, 3 to 10 metres tall, which is endemic to Fiji. It grows in dense lowland rain forest on Mt. Korombamba (Korobaba) on Viti Levu. It was known from a small population in an area which was subsequently logged, and the current status of the species is not known.
