= Astronidium fraternum =

Conservation status
- Data Deficient (IUCN 3.1)

Scientific classification
- Kingdom: Plantae
- Clade: Embryophytes
- Clade: Tracheophytes
- Clade: Spermatophytes
- Clade: Angiosperms
- Clade: Eudicots
- Clade: Rosids
- Order: Myrtales
- Family: Melastomataceae
- Genus: Astronidium
- Species: A. fraternum

Binomial name
- Astronidium fraternum (A.Gray) J.F.Maxwell

Synonyms
- Astronia fraterna A.Gray; Astronia pileolata Triana; Naudinia pileolata Decne. ex Triana; Naudinia umbella Decne. ex Triana; Naudiniella fraterna Krasser; Pharmacum fraternum Kuntze; Pharmacum pileolatum Kuntze

Species of flowering plant

Astronidium fraternum is a species of plant in the family Melastomataceae. It is endemic to the Society Islands (Tahiti, Moorea, Raiatea) of French Polynesia.
