= Astronidium kasiense =

Conservation status
- Critically Endangered (IUCN 3.1)

Scientific classification
- Kingdom: Plantae
- Clade: Tracheophytes
- Clade: Angiosperms
- Clade: Eudicots
- Clade: Rosids
- Order: Myrtales
- Family: Melastomataceae
- Genus: Astronidium
- Species: A. kasiense

Binomial name
- Astronidium kasiense A.C.Sm.

Species of flowering plant

Astronidium kasiense is a species of plant in the family Melastomataceae. It is a tree endemic to Fiji, where it is known only from Mt. Kasi on Vanua Levu.

The IUCN Red List assesses the species as critically endangered. Plants of the World Online assesses it as extinct.
