= Astronidium =

Scientific classification
- Kingdom: Plantae
- Clade: Tracheophytes
- Clade: Angiosperms
- Clade: Eudicots
- Clade: Rosids
- Order: Myrtales
- Family: Melastomataceae
- Genus: Astronidium; A.Gray

Synonyms
- Everettia Merr.; Lomanodia Raf.; Naudiniella Krasser

Genus of flowering plants

Astronidium is a genus of flowering plants in family Melastomataceae. It includes 68 species which range from Papuasia to the Society Islands.

== Species ==
68 species are accepted.

- Astronidium aneityense (Guillaumin) A.C.Sm.
- Astronidium angulosum J.F.Maxwell
- Astronidium anomalum Merr. & L.M.Perry
- Astronidium banksianum (Guillaumin) A.C.Sm.
- Astronidium basinervatum J.F.Maxwell
- Astronidium biakense J.F.Maxwell
- Astronidium bracteatum J.F.Maxwell
- Astronidium brassii Markgr.
- Astronidium carolinense (Kaneh.) Markgr.
- Astronidium circumscissum J.F.Maxwell
- Astronidium confertiflorum (A.Gray) Markgr.
- Astronidium constrictum J.F.Maxwell
- Astronidium cuneatum J.F.Maxwell
- Astronidium degeneri A.C.Sm.
- Astronidium floribundum (Gillespie) A.C.Sm.
- Astronidium fragilissimum J.F.Maxwell
- Astronidium fraternum (A.Gray) J.F.Maxwell
- Astronidium glabrum (G.Forst.) Markgraf
- Astronidium inflatum (A.C.Sm.) A.C.Sm.
- Astronidium infundibulare J.F.Maxwell
- Astronidium insulare Merr. & L.M.Perry
- Astronidium kasiense A.C.Sm.
- Astronidium lemafaense J.F.Maxwell
- Astronidium lepidopunctatum J.F.Maxwell
- Astronidium lepidotum A.C.Sm.
- Astronidium ligulatum (J.W.Moore) J.F.Maxwell
- Astronidium loloruense J.F.Maxwell
- Astronidium macranthum (A.C.Sm.) A.C.Sm.
- Astronidium mammiforme J.F.Maxwell
- Astronidium micranthum J.F.Maxwell
- Astronidium miraculum-dei Veldkamp & J.F.Maxwell
- Astronidium montanum Merr. & L.M.Perry
- Astronidium morobiense J.F.Maxwell
- Astronidium muscosum Merr. & L.M.Perry
- Astronidium navigatorum Christoph.
- Astronidium novae-ebudaense J.F.Maxwell
- Astronidium novae-hannoverae (Engl.) Merr. & L.M.Perry
- Astronidium novoguineense Merr. & L.M.Perry
- Astronidium ovalifolium (Decne.) J.F.Maxwell
- Astronidium palauense (Kaneh.) Markgr.
- Astronidium pallidiflorum A.C.Sm.
- Astronidium pallidum J.F.Maxwell
- Astronidium parviflorum A.Gray
- Astronidium pickeringii (A.Gray) Christoph.
- Astronidium ponapense (Kaneh.) Markgr.
- Astronidium pseudoparviflorum J.F.Maxwell
- Astronidium puberulum J.F.Maxwell
- Astronidium rhaphidifolium J.F.Maxwell
- Astronidium robustum (Seem.) A.C.Sm.
- Astronidium saccatum (J.W.Moore) J.F.Maxwell
- Astronidium saulae A.C.Sm.
- Astronidium salomonense Merr. & L.M.Perry
- Astronidium samoense (S.Moore) Markgr.
- Astronidium storckii Seem.
- Astronidium subcordatum (A.Gray) Christoph.
- Astronidium subvaginatum Ohwi
- Astronidium sudestense J.F.Maxwell
- Astronidium tomentosum (Seem.) A.C.Sm.
- Astronidium uncinatotessellatum J.F.Maxwell
- Astronidium vaginatovillosum J.F.Maxwell
- Astronidium vanikoroense J.F.Maxwell
- Astronidium variabile J.F.Maxwell
- Astronidium victoriae (Gillespie) A.C.Sm.
