= Astronidium degeneri =

Conservation status
- Endangered (IUCN 3.1)

Scientific classification
- Kingdom: Plantae
- Clade: Tracheophytes
- Clade: Angiosperms
- Clade: Eudicots
- Clade: Rosids
- Order: Myrtales
- Family: Melastomataceae
- Genus: Astronidium
- Species: A. degeneri

Binomial name
- Astronidium degeneri A.C.Sm.

Species of flowering plant

Astronidium degeneri is a species of plant in the family Melastomataceae. It is endemic to Fiji.
