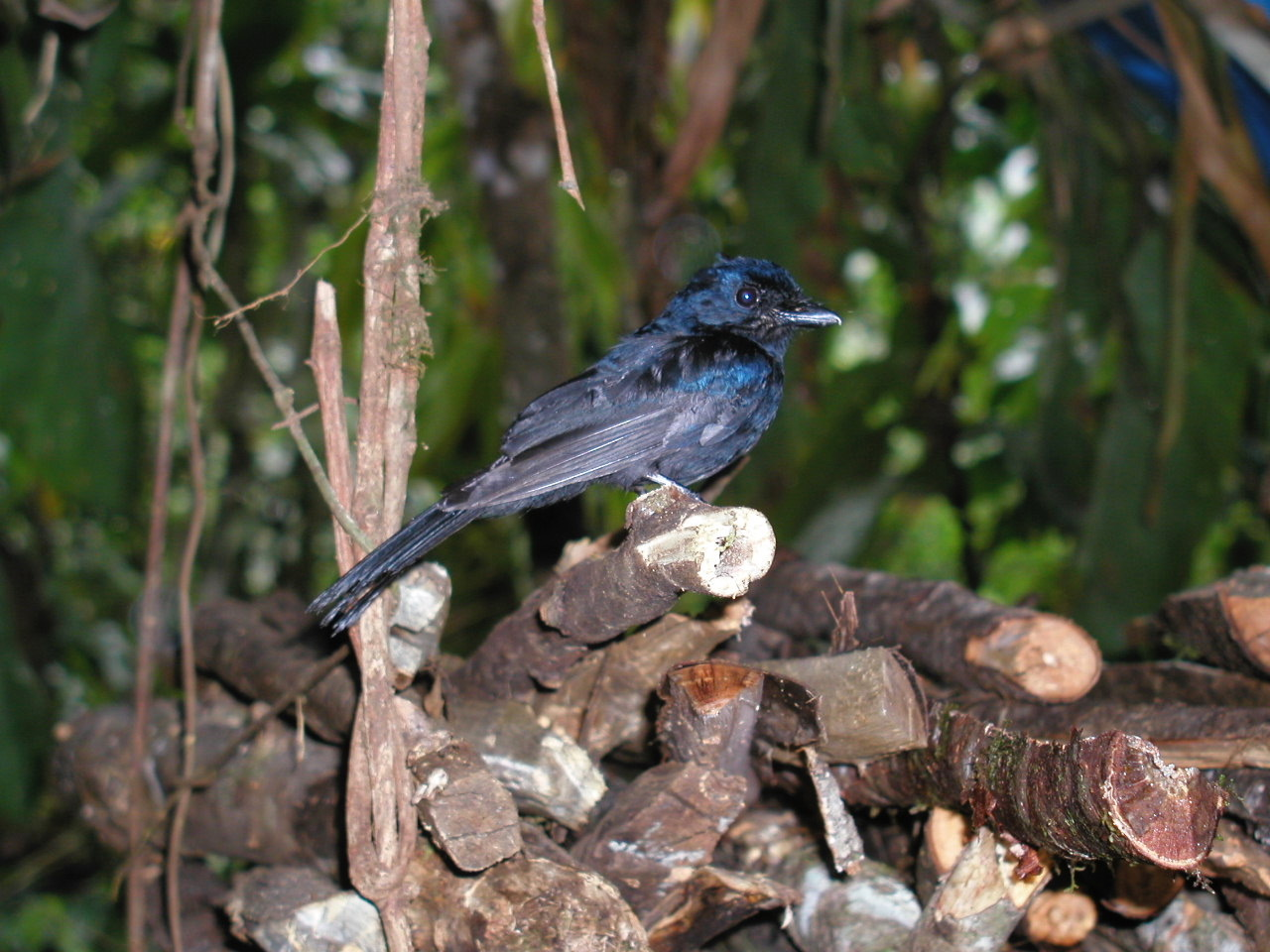

Conservation status
- Least Concern (IUCN 3.1)

Scientific classification
- Kingdom: Animalia
- Phylum: Chordata
- Class: Aves
- Order: Passeriformes
- Family: Rhipiduridae
- Subfamily: Lamproliinae
- Genus: Chaetorhynchus; A.B. Meyer, 1874
- Species: C. papuensis

Binomial name
- Chaetorhynchus papuensis Meyer, 1874

= Drongo fantail =

Species of bird

The drongo fantail (Chaetorhynchus papuensis), also known as the pygmy drongo, is a species of passerine bird endemic to the island of New Guinea. It is the only species in the genus Chaetorhynchus. The species was long placed within the drongo family Dicruridae, but it differs from others in that family in having twelve rectrices instead of ten. Molecular analysis also supports moving the species out from the drongo family, instead placing it as a sister species to the silktail of Fiji, and both those species in the fantail family Rhipiduridae.
