= Astronidium robustum =

Conservation status
- Least Concern (IUCN 3.1)

Scientific classification
- Kingdom: Plantae
- Clade: Tracheophytes
- Clade: Angiosperms
- Clade: Eudicots
- Clade: Rosids
- Order: Myrtales
- Family: Melastomataceae
- Genus: Astronidium
- Species: A. robustum

Binomial name
- Astronidium robustum (Seem.) A.C.Sm.

Synonyms
- Astronia robusta Seem.; Pharmacum robustum (Seem.) Kuntze

Species of flowering plant

Astronidium robustum is a species of flowering plant in the family Melastomataceae. It is a tree endemic to Fiji, where it is native to the islands of Viti Levu, Vanua Levu and Taveuni. It grows 2–15 metres tall in dense rain forest, often along creeks or on river banks, from 50 to 900 metres elevation.

The species was first described as Astronia robusta by Berthold Carl Seemann in 1866. In 1942 Albert Charles Smith placed the species in genus Astronidium as A. robustum.
