= Mount Koroyanitu =

Mountain in Fiji

- Mount Evans
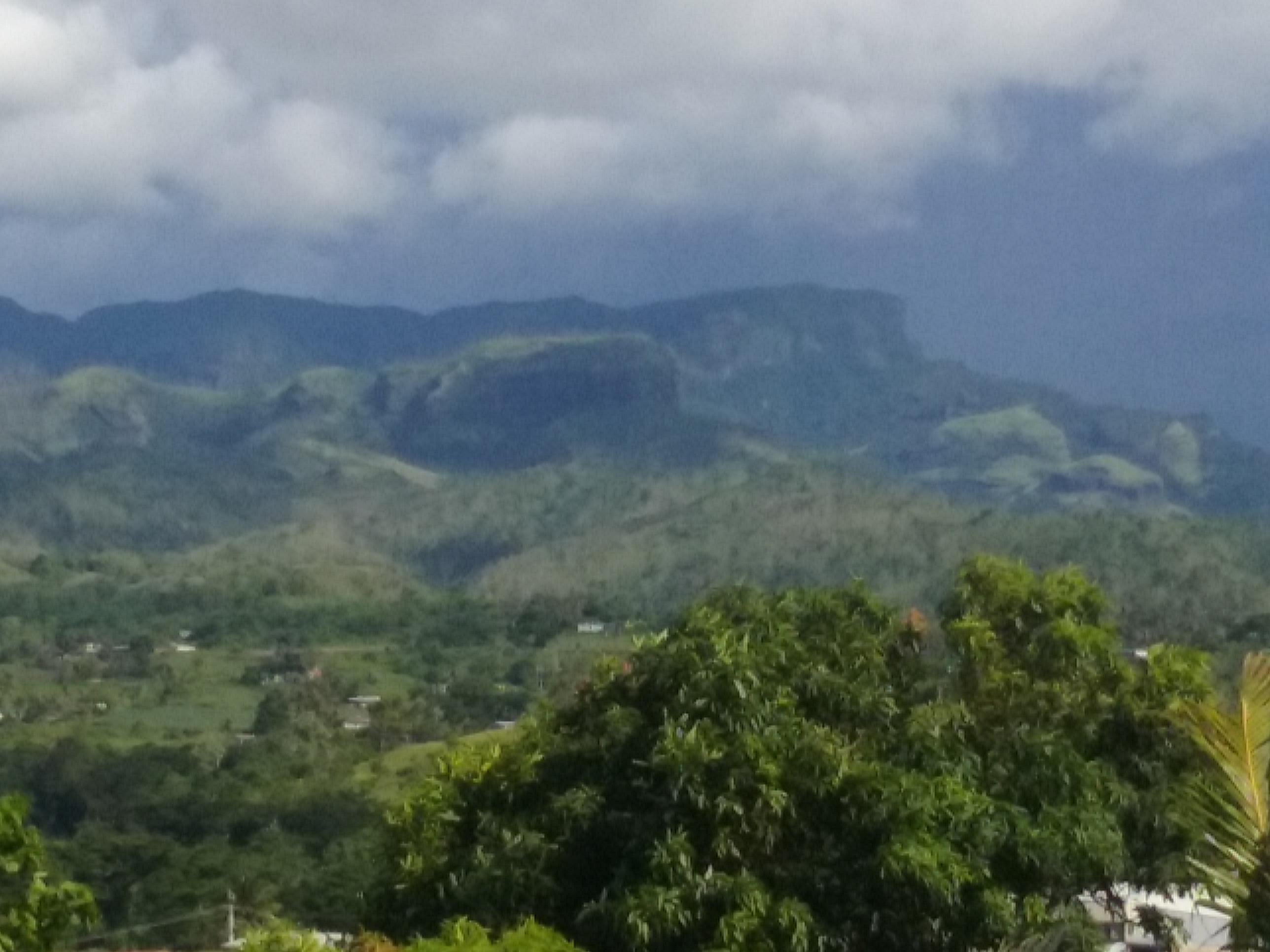
- Mount Koroyanitu (the taller one)

Highest point
- Elevation: 1,195 m (3,921 ft)
- Coordinates: 17°40′03″S 177°34′24″E

Geography
- Location within Fiji
- Country: Fiji
- Division: Western Division
- Protected area: Koroyanitu Heritage Park
- Cities: Nadi and Lautoka
- Biome: Fiji tropical dry forests

Mount Koroyanitu, also known as Mount Evans, is the third highest peak in Fiji and located in the Evans Ranges in the Western Division of the island of Viti Levu. Its elevation is 1,195 metres (3,921 ft). Koroyanitu in Fijian means "Village of the Devil".

It lies between the two main towns of Fiji's west namely Nadi and Lautoka.

A 17,100 hectares (42,000 acres) area covering Mount Koroyanitu and the Vaturu Dam catchment is the Koroyanitu/Vaturu Important Bird Area. It supports a population of vulnerable shy ground-doves and near threatened masked shining parrots.

The Koroyanitu Heritage Park covers the mountain and surrounding area, protecting an area of 35 km^{2} (14 sq mi). It was created in 1989, and is managed by the community in Ba, which lies northeast of the mountain.
