= Astronidium glabrum =

Conservation status
- Least Concern (IUCN 2.3)

Scientific classification
- Kingdom: Plantae
- Clade: Tracheophytes
- Clade: Angiosperms
- Clade: Eudicots
- Clade: Rosids
- Order: Myrtales
- Family: Melastomataceae
- Genus: Astronidium
- Species: A. glabrum

Binomial name
- Astronidium glabrum (J.G.Forster) Markgraf

Species of flowering plant

Astronidium glabrum is a species of plant in the family Melastomataceae. It is endemic to the Society Islands (Raiatea and Tahiti) of French Polynesia.
