= Astronidium saccatum =

Conservation status
- Endangered (IUCN 3.1)

Scientific classification
- Kingdom: Plantae
- Clade: Tracheophytes
- Clade: Angiosperms
- Clade: Eudicots
- Clade: Rosids
- Order: Myrtales
- Family: Melastomataceae
- Genus: Astronidium
- Species: A. saccatum

Binomial name
- Astronidium saccatum (J.W.Moore) J.F.Maxwell (1990)

Synonyms
- Astronia saccata J.W.Moore (1933)

Species of flowering plant

Astronidium saccatum is a species of plant in the family Melastomataceae. It is endemic to the Society Islands of French Polynesia. It is native to the islands of Huahine, Raiatea, Tahaʻa, and Tahiti, where it grows in mountain forest and elfin scrub from 350 to 1000 meters elevation.
