= Astronidium tomentosum =

Conservation status
- Near Threatened (IUCN 3.1)

Scientific classification
- Kingdom: Plantae
- Clade: Tracheophytes
- Clade: Angiosperms
- Clade: Eudicots
- Clade: Rosids
- Order: Myrtales
- Family: Melastomataceae
- Genus: Astronidium
- Species: A. tomentosum

Binomial name
- Astronidium tomentosum (Seem.) A.C.Sm.

Synonyms
- Astronia tomentosa Seem. (1866) (basionym); Pharmacum tomentosum (Seem.) Kuntze

Species of flowering plant

Astronidium tomentosum is a species of plant in the family Melastomataceae. It is endemic to Fiji.

The species was first described as Astronia tomentosa by Berthold Carl Seemann in 1866. In 1942 Albert Charles Smith placed the species in genus Astronidium as A. tomentosum.
