= Astronidium ligulatum =

Conservation status
- Data Deficient (IUCN 3.1)

Scientific classification
- Kingdom: Plantae
- Clade: Embryophytes
- Clade: Tracheophytes
- Clade: Spermatophytes
- Clade: Angiosperms
- Clade: Eudicots
- Clade: Rosids
- Order: Myrtales
- Family: Melastomataceae
- Genus: Astronidium
- Species: A. ligulatum

Binomial name
- Astronidium ligulatum (J.W.Moore) J.F.Maxwell

Synonyms
- Astronia ligulata J.W.Moore

Species of flowering plant

Astronidium ligulatum is a species of plant in the family Melastomataceae. It is endemic to the island of Raiatea in the Society Islands of French Polynesia, where it grows in mountain forest on wet clay soil around 460 metres (1,500 ft) elevation.
