= Natewa silktail =

Conservation status
- Vulnerable (IUCN 3.1)

Scientific classification
- Kingdom: Animalia
- Phylum: Chordata
- Class: Aves
- Order: Passeriformes
- Family: Rhipiduridae
- Genus: Lamprolia
- Species: L. klinesmithi

Binomial name
- Lamprolia klinesmithi Ramsay, EP, 1876

Species of bird

The Natewa silktail (Lamprolia klinesmithi) is a species of bird endemic to Fiji. This beautiful bird looks superficially like a diminutive bird-of-paradise but it is actually closely related to the fantails.

The species name kleinschmidti is named for Theodor Kleinschmidt, a collector from Museum Godeffroy in Hamburg, who obtained the first specimens.

== Description ==
The silktail is a small black bird, measuring around 10 centimetres (3.9 in) and weighing 10 to 12.5 g (0.35–0.44 oz). It is a small, dumpy bird with long rounded wings, and a short rounded tail. The plumage of the male is velvet black with metallic blue iridescent spangling on the crown and breast, and silky white lower-back patch that travels most of the length down the tail. The margin of the tail is black, sometimes this tip has the same iridescence as other parts of the body. The female is similar to the male, except less glossy, and immature birds are duller than the adults and may have buffy rumps and backs. The irises of this species are dark, and the legs and bill are blackish. The bill is heavy and slightly hooked at the end. The legs are long and the feet strong. It is smaller than the Taveuni silktail and has more iridescence plumage.

== Distribution and habitat ==
The silktail is endemic to forests of Vanua Levu in Fiji, where it only occurs in the east of the island on the Natewa Peninsula. It occurs in mature wet rainforests, as well as forest patches, and is also found in human-modified habitats such as logged forests and in plantations near patches of natural forest.

== Behaviour ==
It can be quite elusive and difficult to see, but may also be confiding and approachable. It is usually very active at dawn, and is encountered either singly or in small flocks.

The diet consists mainly of insects, worms and arthropods.

== Status and conservation ==
The Natewa silktail has a very small range, occurring only on the Natewa Peninsula of the Fijian island of Vanua Levu. Deforestation, especially for kava plantations, is the largest threat to this species. As of 2023, its total population is estimated to be 3,000 – 5,000 mature individuals, and is expected to be decreasing. For these reasons, the species is assessed by the IUCN as Vulnerable.
