= Astronidium inflatum =

Conservation status
- Endangered (IUCN 3.1)

Scientific classification
- Kingdom: Plantae
- Clade: Tracheophytes
- Clade: Angiosperms
- Clade: Eudicots
- Clade: Rosids
- Order: Myrtales
- Family: Melastomataceae
- Genus: Astronidium
- Species: A. inflatum

Binomial name
- Astronidium inflatum (A.C.Sm.) A.C.Sm.

Synonyms
- Astronia inflata A.C.Sm.

Species of flowering plant

Astronidium inflatum is a species of flowering plant in the family Melastomataceae. It is endemic to Fiji.

The species was first described as Astronia inflata by Albert Charles Smith in 1936. In 1942 Smith placed the species in genus Astronidium as A. inflatum.
