= Astronidium floribundum =

Conservation status
- Data Deficient (IUCN 3.1)

Scientific classification
- Kingdom: Plantae
- Clade: Embryophytes
- Clade: Tracheophytes
- Clade: Spermatophytes
- Clade: Angiosperms
- Clade: Eudicots
- Clade: Rosids
- Order: Myrtales
- Family: Melastomataceae
- Genus: Astronidium
- Species: A. floribundum

Binomial name
- Astronidium floribundum (Gillespie) A.C.Sm.

Synonyms
- Astronia floribunda Gillespie

Species of flowering plant

Astronidium floribundum is a species of flowering plant in the family Melastomataceae. It is a small tree endemic to Fiji, where it known only from the southeastern slope of Mt. Korumbamba (Korobaba) on Viti Levu.

The species was first described as Astronia floribunda by John Wynn Gillespie in 1931. In 1942 Albert Charles Smith placed the species in genus Astronidium as A. floribundum.
