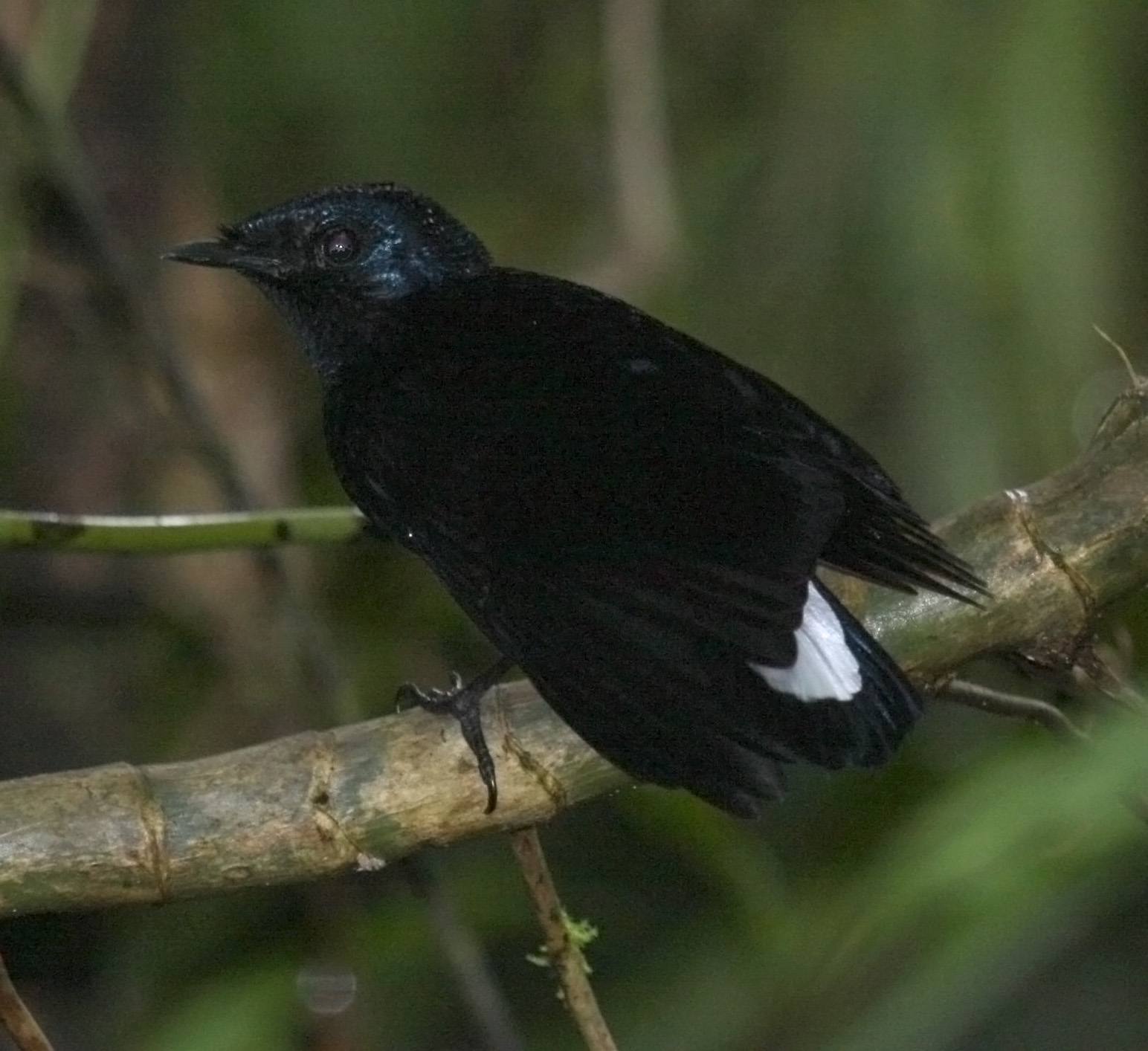
- Taveuni silktail (Lamprolia victoriae)

Scientific classification
- Kingdom: Animalia
- Phylum: Chordata
- Class: Aves
- Order: Passeriformes
- Family: Rhipiduridae
- Subfamily: Lamproliinae
- Genus: Lamprolia; Finsch, 1874

Type species
- Lamprolia victoriae Finsch, 1874

= Silktail =

Genus of birds

The silktails are a group of birds endemic to Fiji. The two species (Taveuni silktail and Natewa silktail) are placed in the genus Lamprolia. They look superficially like a diminutive bird-of-paradise but are actually closely related to the fantails.

== Species ==
Image	Common name	Scientific name	Distribution
	Taveuni silktail	Lamprolia victoriae, Finsch, 1874	Taveuni.
	Natewa silktail	Lamprolia klinesmithi, Ramsay, EP, 1876	Vanua Levu.

== Taxonomy and systematics ==
The systematic position of the silktails have been a long-standing mystery. When describing the Taveuni silktail, Otto Finsch wrote "I scarcely remember a bird which has puzzled me in respect of its generic position so much as this curious little creature". They have variously been placed with the birds-of-paradise (Paradisaeidae), the Australasian robins (Petroicidae) and the fairy-wrens (Maluridae). Since 1980, the genus has generally been considered to be an ancient and aberrant monarch flycatcher. A 2009 molecular study placed them as a sister to the pygmy drongo of the highlands of New Guinea, and the two of these as a sister clade to the fantails (Rhipiduridae).

The genus Lamprolia is named after the diminutive of lampros (Ancient Greek) for splendid or brilliant.

== Description ==
The silktails are small black birds, measuring around 12 centimetres (4.7 in) and weighing 16 to 21 g (0.56–0.74 oz). They are small, dumpy birds with long rounded wings, and a short rounded tail. The plumage of the male is velvet black with metallic blue iridescent spangling on the crown and breast, and silky white lower-back patch that travels most of the length down the tail. The margin of the tail is black, sometimes this tip has the same iridescence as other parts of the body. The female is similar to the male, except less glossy, and immature birds are duller than the adults and may have buffy rumps and backs. The irises of this species are dark, and the legs and bill are blackish. The bill is heavy and slightly hooked at the end. The legs are long and the feet strong. The Natewa silktail is smaller than the Taveuni silktail, and has more iridescence plumage.

== Behaviour ==
The silktails can be quite elusive and difficult to see, but may also be confiding and approachable. They are usually very active at dawn, and is encountered either singly or in small flocks.

The diet consists mainly of insects, worms and arthropods.
