= Cryptocarya turbinata =

Scientific classification
- Kingdom: Plantae
- Clade: Tracheophytes
- Clade: Angiosperms
- Clade: Magnoliids
- Order: Laurales
- Family: Lauraceae
- Genus: Cryptocarya
- Species: C. turbinata

Binomial name
- Cryptocarya turbinata Gillespie (1931)

Synonyms
- Cryptocarya glaucescens var. pacifica Burkill (1901)

Species of flowering plant

Cryptocarya turbinata is a species of flowering plant in the laurel family, Lauraceae. It is a tree native to Fiji, Niue, the Samoan Islands, Tonga, and Vanuatu.

In Tonga it is a common canopy tree in lowland tropical rain forest below 500 meters elevation.
