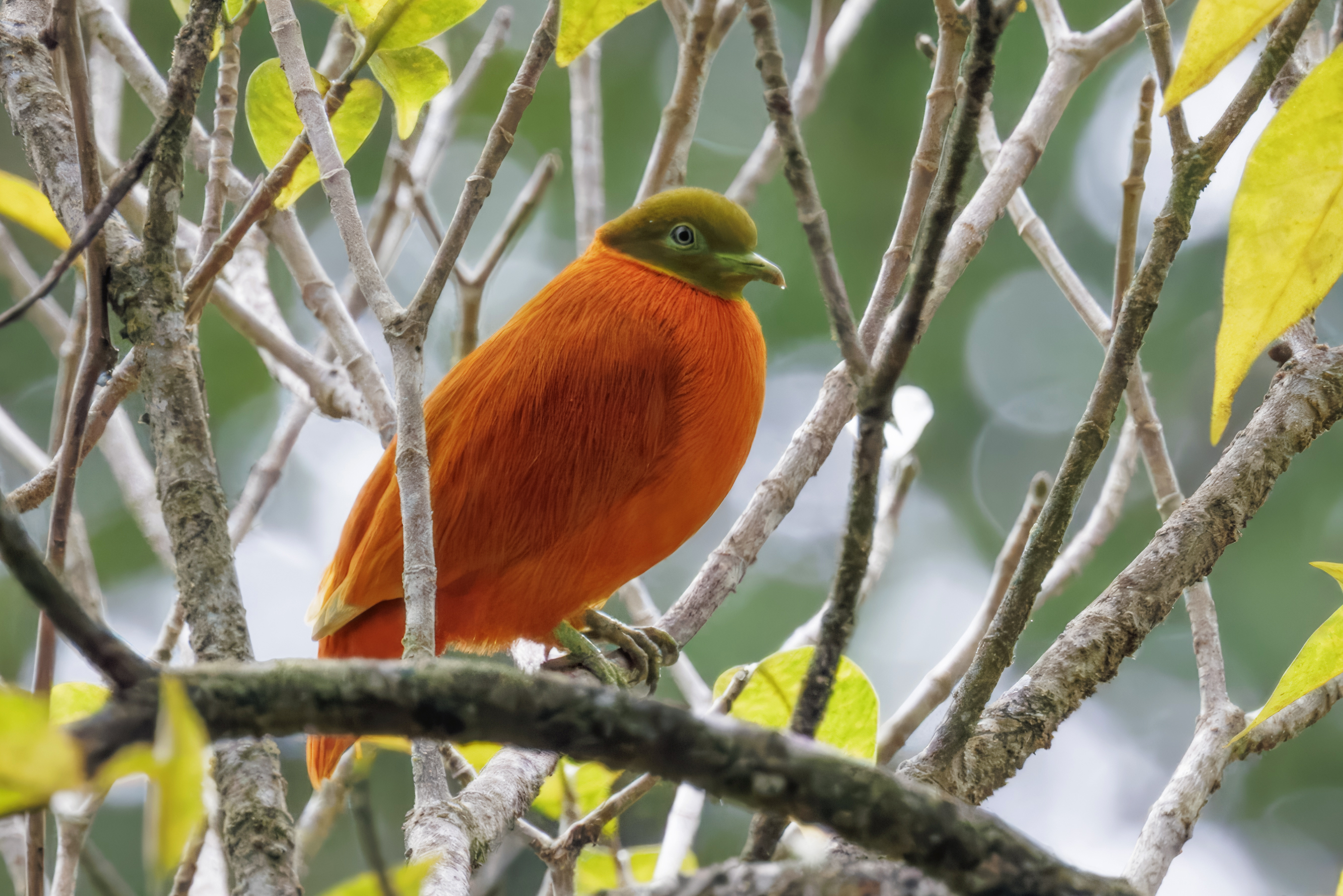
- Male on Taveuni
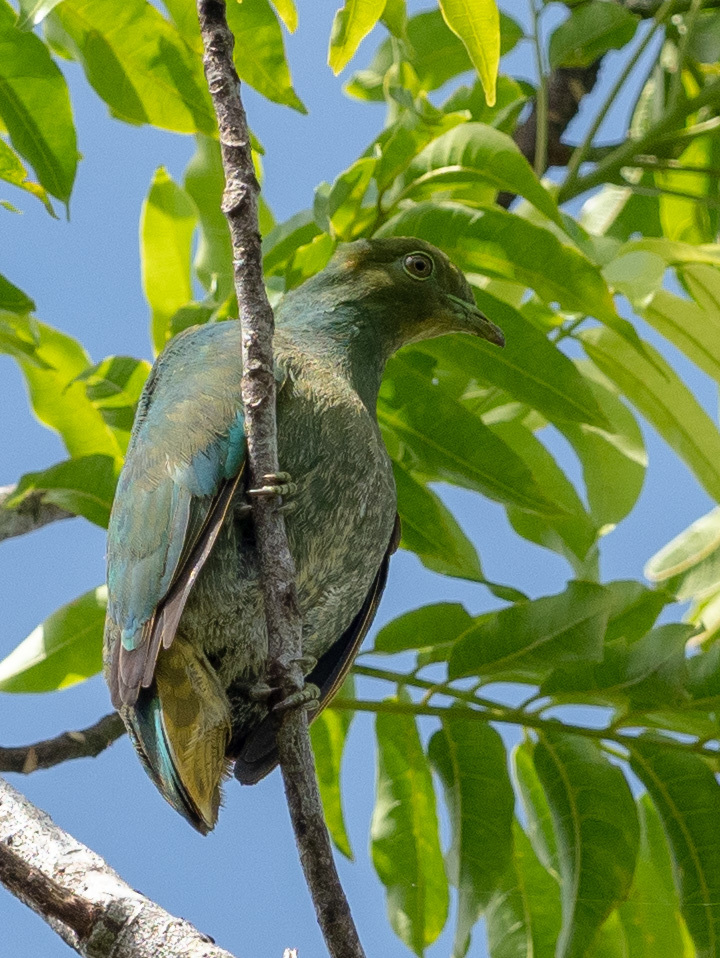
- Female

Conservation status
- Least Concern (IUCN 3.1)

Scientific classification
- Kingdom: Animalia
- Phylum: Chordata
- Class: Aves
- Order: Columbiformes
- Family: Columbidae
- Genus: Ptilinopus
- Species: P. victor

Binomial name
- Ptilinopus victor (Gould, 1872)

Synonyms
- Chrysoena victor Gould, 1872

= Orange dove =

Species of bird endemic to Fiji

The orange dove or orange fruit dove (Ptilinopus victor) is a species of bird in the pigeon family Columbidae. One of the most colorful doves, the male has a golden olive head and elongated bright orange "hair-like" body feathers. The golden-olive remiges are typically covered by the long orange wing coverts when perched. The legs, bill and orbital skin are bluish-green and the iris is whitish. The female is a dark green bird with blackish tail and orange-yellow undertail coverts. The young resemble females.

The orange dove is endemic to Fiji, where it inhabits forests on the islands of Vanua Levu, Taveuni, Rabi, Kioa, Qamea and Laucala. They mainly feed on various small fruits, berries, caterpillars and insects. The female usually lays one white egg. The orange dove is closely related to the whistling fruit dove and golden fruit dove. A common species throughout its limited range, the orange dove is evaluated as being of least concern by the International Union for Conservation of Nature.

== Taxonomy and systematics ==
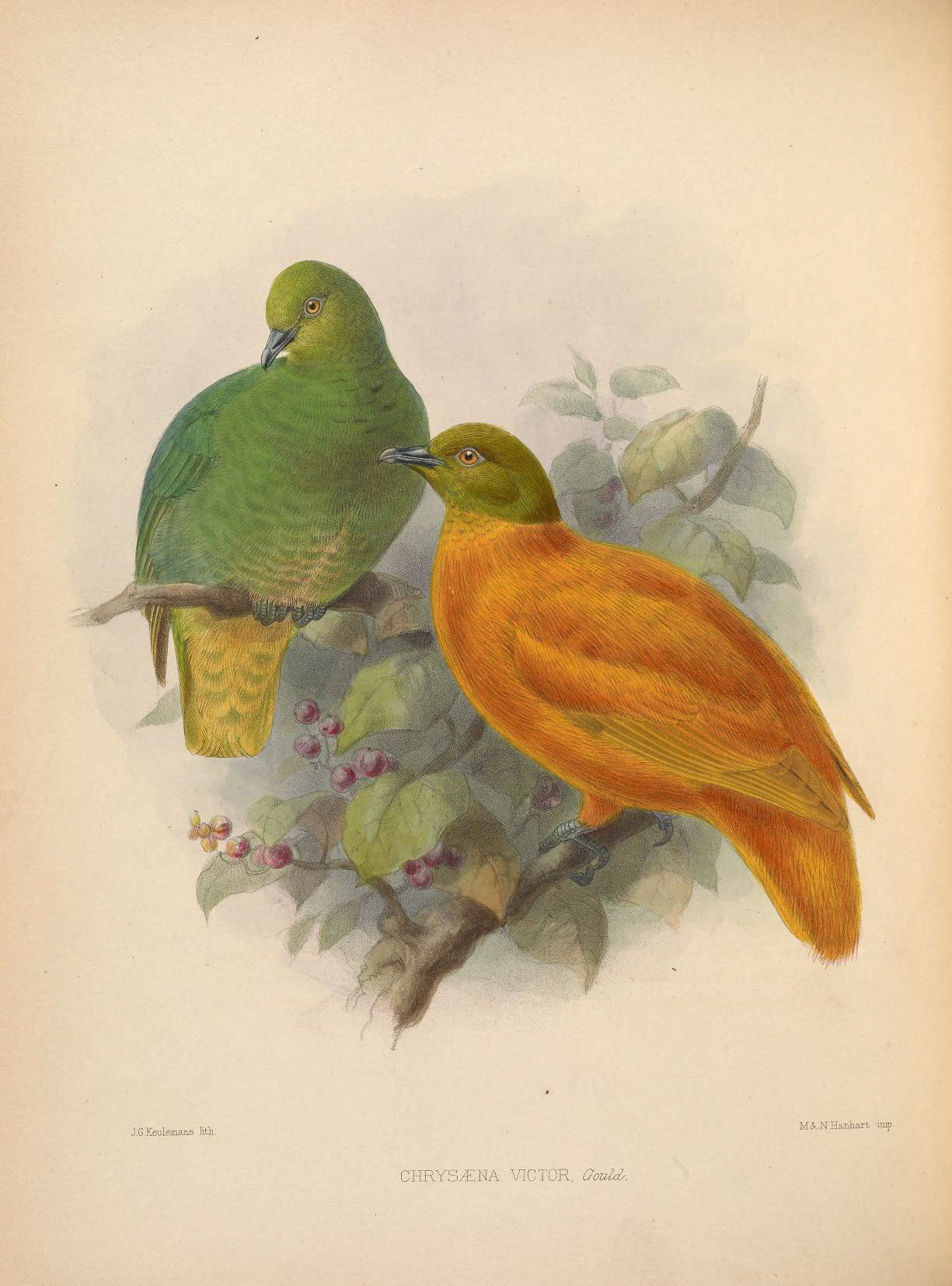
Illustration of Ptilinopus victor

The orange dove was originally described as Chrysoena victor by John Gould in 1872, based on specimens from Vanua Levu, Fiji. The species' generic name comes from the Ancient Greek ptilon (feather) and pous (foot), while the specific epithet victor is from the Latin victor, meaning "conqueror". Alternative names for the orange dove include orange fruit dove and flame dove.

It is one of over 50 species in the genus Ptilinopus. Within the genus, it is sister to the whistling fruit dove, with these two being most closely related to the golden dove. These three species are placed together in the subgenus Chrysoena. They have also sometimes been treated as their own genus.

=== Subspecies ===
There are two recognised subspecies. Intermediates between the subspecies exist.

- P. v. victor (Gould, 1871): The nominate subspecies, it is found on Vanua Levu, Taveuni, Kioa, and Rabi. Populations from Laucala and Taveuni are also sometimes included, but they are intermediate and may be better treated as part of aureus.
- P. v. aureus (Amadon, 1943): Found on Qamea and Laucala. Males are larger than those of the nominate, with yellower wings and paler heads.

== Distribution and habitat ==
The orange dove is endemic to Fiji, where it is found on the islands of Vanua Levu, Taveuni, Kioa, Rabi, Laucala, and Qamea. It inhabits woodland like other species in the subgenus Chrysoena. It prefers open forests, including secondary and gallery forest, but is also common in closed-canopy old-growth forest. The species is submontane and occurs at elevations of 420–980 m (1,380–3,220 ft), but its absence in lowlands may be caused by a lack of suitable habitat due to deforestation instead of elevation.

== Behaviour and ecology ==
The orange dove is not very social and usually lives alone or in pairs, or less frequently in small groups or in pairs of two females. Flocks of up to seven birds have been recorded in one tree. Its flight is quick and straight, with whirring wingbeats.

=== Diet ===
The species is mainly frugivorous, feeding on small fruits and berries with a diameter of 4–7 mm (0.16–0.28 in). It has also been observed gleaning invertebrates like caterpillars from leaves. Foraging mostly occurs in the upper canopy and understorey, and flocks at fruits trees are rarely larger than usual ones.

=== Breeding ===
Nesting has been observed in June, September, November, and December, suggesting that the orange dove's breeding season is extended. Nests are flimsy platforms made of a few intertwined sticks, usually placed low down on a tree in the subcanopy, with one nest observed at a height of 2.5 m (8.2 ft). Clutches usually contain a single white egg, although some have been recorded with two eggs. Only females have been observed incubating eggs and taking care of chicks.
