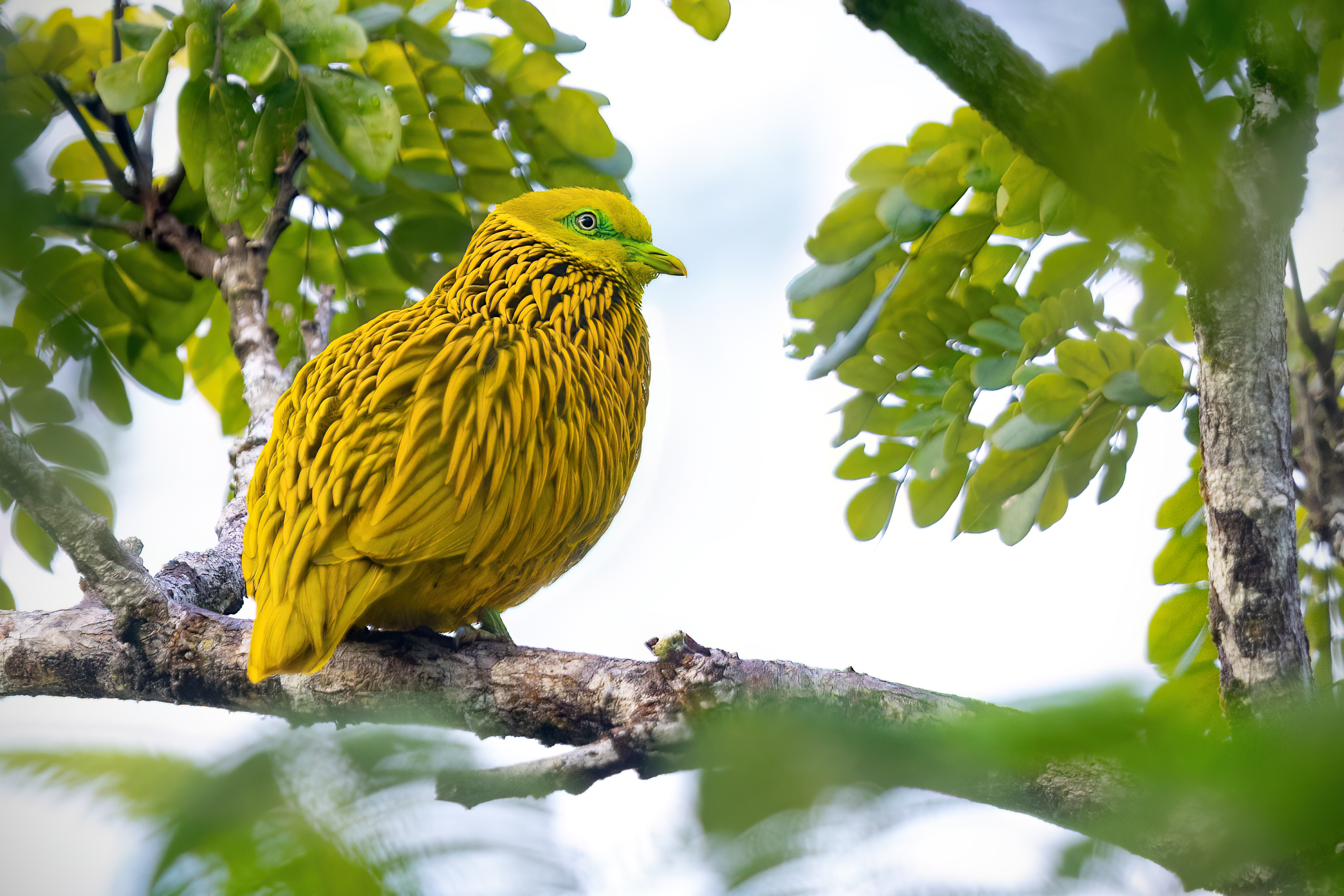
- male
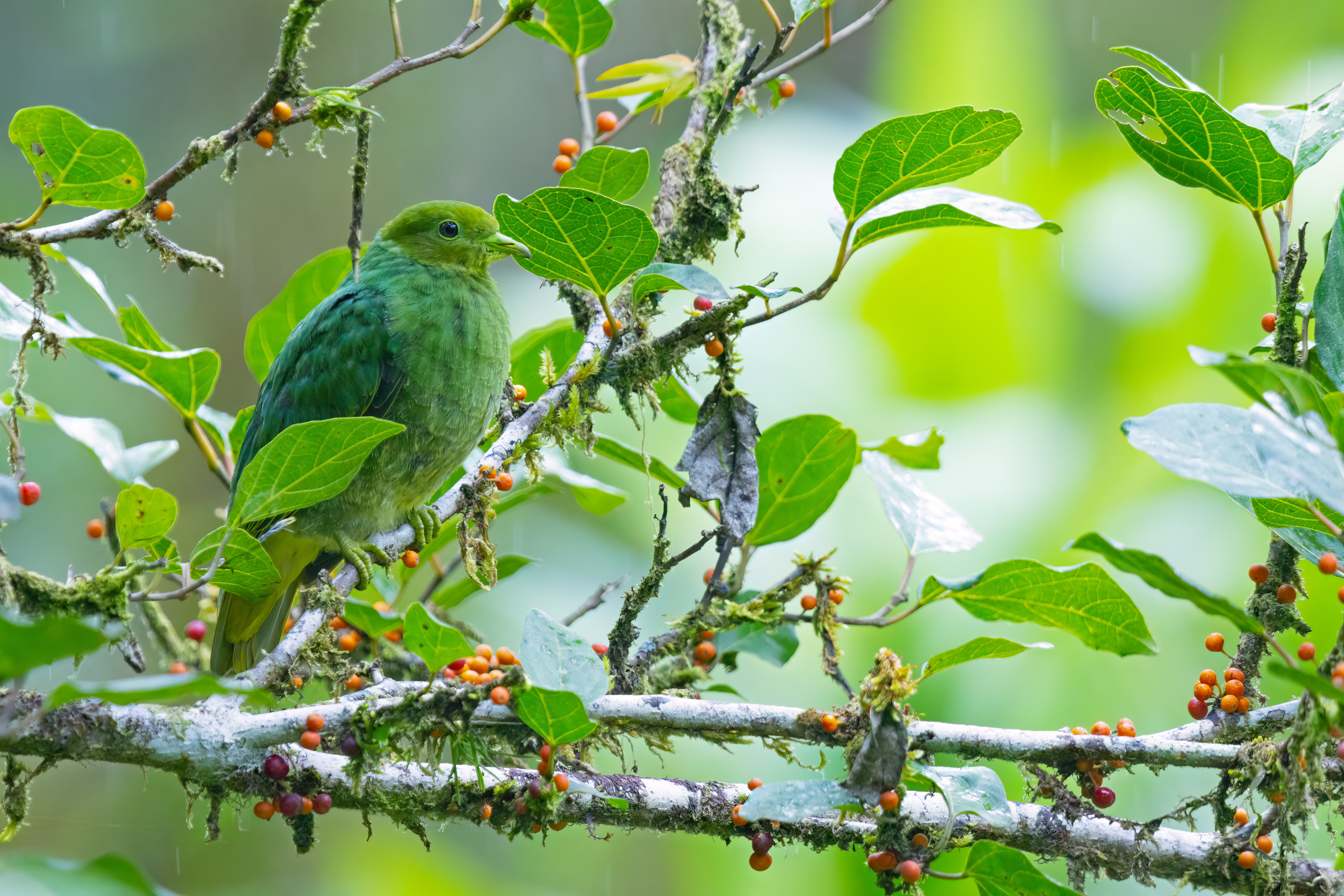
- female

Conservation status
- Least Concern (IUCN 3.1)

Scientific classification
- Kingdom: Animalia
- Phylum: Chordata
- Class: Aves
- Order: Columbiformes
- Family: Columbidae
- Genus: Ptilinopus
- Species: P. luteovirens

Binomial name
- Ptilinopus luteovirens (Hombron & Jacquinot, 1841)

Synonyms
- Chrysoena luteovirens

= Golden dove =

Species of bird

The golden dove (Ptilinopus luteovirens), also known as the golden fruit dove, lemon dove or yellow dove, is a small, approximately 20 cm (8 in) long, short-tailed fruit-dove in the family Columbidae. The common name refers to the males' bright golden-yellow colour. The body feathers appear almost iridescent due to their elongated shape and hair-like texture. The head is slightly duller with a greenish tinge. The bill, orbital skin and legs are bluish-green and the iris is whitish. The underwings and tail coverts are yellow. The female is a dark green bird with bare parts resembling those of the male. The young resembles the female.

The golden dove is endemic to the forests of Fiji. The diet consists mainly of various small fruits, berries and insects. The female usually lays a single white egg.

The golden dove is closely related to the whistling dove and orange dove. These species are allopatric, meaning they do not share the same habitat in any location.

A common species throughout its limited range, the golden dove is evaluated as Least Concern on the IUCN Red List of Threatened Species.

== Taxonomy and systematics ==
The golden dove is one of over 50 species in the genus Ptilinopus. Within the genus, it is most closely related to the orange dove and whistling dove. These three species are placed together in their own subgenus, Chrysoena. They are also sometimes treated as their own genus. It is monotypic.

The species' generic name comes from the Ancient Greek ptilon (feather) and pous (foot), while the specific epithet luteovirens is from the Latin luteus (orange-yellow), and virens (green), referring to its colour.

== Distribution and habitat ==
The golden dove is endemic to the islands of Viti Levu, Ovalau, Beqa, Ngau and Waya. It mainly inhabits open forest, gallery forest, and secondary growth, but is also found in mature rainforest with sparse undergrowth and tall trees. It is found between elevations of 60–1,200 m (200–3,940 ft). They are occasionally found near towns and villages.
