= Fiji tropical dry forests =

Terrestrial ecoregion in Fiji

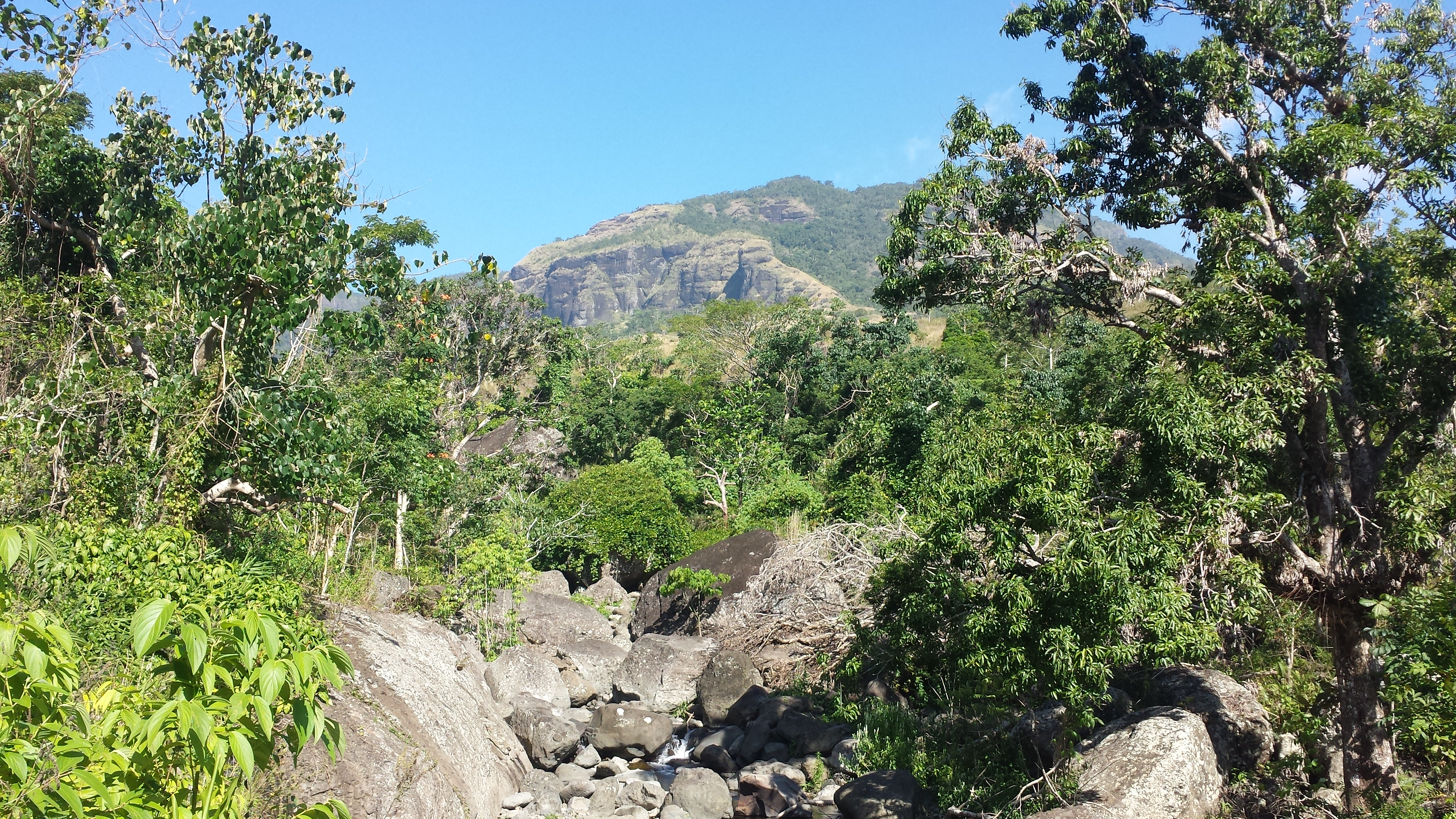
- Mount Batilamu in Koroyanitu National Heritage Park

- Location of the Fiji tropical dry forests (OC0201) in the Fijian islands.

Ecology
- Realm: Oceanian
- Biome: tropical and subtropical dry broadleaf forests
- Borders: Fiji tropical moist forests

Geography
- Area: 6,757 km^{2} (2,609 sq mi)
- Country: Fiji

Conservation
- Conservation status: Critical/endangered
- Protected: 204 km² (3%)

The Fiji tropical dry forests are a tropical dry forest ecoregion in Fiji. The dry forests occupy the leeward northwestern portion of Fiji's two largest islands, Viti Levu and Vanua Levu.

== Geography ==
The dry forests are in the rain shadow of Viti Levu and Vanua Levu's central mountains, which intercept the prevailing southeast trade winds.

The Fijian islands are mostly volcanic in origin, with areas of uplifted coral limestone and sedimentary rock. The islands emerged from the sea between 5 and 20 million years ago.

== Climate ==
The climate is tropical and seasonally dry. Rainfall is from 1500 to 2250 mm annually, falling mostly during the December-to-April summer. The other months are relatively dry. Occasionally tropical cyclones hit the islands from the northwest between November and April.

== Flora ==
The natural vegetation of the ecoregion is tropical dry forest. The most widespread dry forest community was characterized Dacrydium nidulum and Fagraea gracilipes, with Myristica castaneifolia, Dysoxylum richii, Parinari insularum, Intsia bijuga, Syzygium spp., Aleurites moluccana, Ficus theophrastoides, the conifers Podocarpus neriifolius and Gymnostoma vitiense, the cycad Cycas seemannii and groves of bamboo (Bambusa spp.). Forests of the endemic sandalwood Santalum yasi, Casuarina equisetifolia, Gymnostoma vitiense and the climbing fern Lygodium scandens are found in drier areas.

Frequent burning of the forest and subsequent erosion have reduced the dry forests to fragments. A sparse grass-fern plant community called talasiga (meaning "sun burnt") is widespread in degraded areas. Talasiga is characterized by the grass Sporobolus indicus and the ferns Pteridium aquilinum and Dicranopteris linearis. Other formerly-forested areas have been converted to a shrub savanna, with the tree Casuarina equisetifolia and a brushy understory that includes Mussaenda raiateensis, Decaspermum vitiense, Dodonaea viscosa, C. seemannii, and the palm Pritchardia pacifica.

== Protected areas ==
A 2017 assessment found that 204 km², or 3%, of the ecoregion is in protected areas. Protected areas include Koroyanitu National Heritage Park on Viti Levu.
