= Myristica inutilis =

Conservation status
- Least Concern (IUCN 3.1)

Scientific classification
- Kingdom: Plantae
- Clade: Tracheophytes
- Clade: Angiosperms
- Clade: Magnoliids
- Order: Magnoliales
- Family: Myristicaceae
- Genus: Myristica
- Species: M. inutilis

Binomial name
- Myristica inutilis Rich. ex A.Gray (1854)

Infraspecific taxa
- Myristica inutilis var. foremaniana W.J.de Wilde; Myristica inutilis subsp. inutilis; Myristica inutilis f. mesophylla W.J.de Wilde; Myristica inutilis f. nanophylla W.J.de Wilde; Myristica inutilis subsp. papuana (Markgr.) W.J.de Wilde; Myristica inutilis subsp. platyphylla (A.C.Sm.) W.J.de Wilde; Myristica inutilis f. procera (A.C.Sm.) W.J.de Wilde

Species of flowering plant in the nutmeg family

Myristica inutilis is a species of flowering plant in the nutmeg family, Myristicaceae. It is a tree native to the South Pacific, ranging from New Guinea through the Bismarck Archipelago and Solomon Islands (including Bougainville) to Vanuatu, Wallis and Futuna, and the Samoan Islands. It is not native to Fiji, but may be present in Tonga.

== Description and habitat ==
Myristica inutilis is an evergreen tree which can grow from 10 to 25 metres tall and occasionally up to 40 metres. It grows in lowland rain forest, hill forest, and littoral (beach) forest, including seasonally inundated areas, where it is typically a canopy tree. It grows mostly between sea level and 350 metres elevation, and occasionally up to 800 metres.

== Conservation and threats ==
The IUCN considers the species to have a wide distribution, stable population, and common within its range, and not currently not facing major threats, so it is assessed as least concern.

== Uses ==
Wood from Myristica inutilis is used for timber, and the red sap (kino) is used as a brown dye. Young shoots harvested from the wild are cooked and eaten like spinach. In some places the sap is used to stop nosebleeds.

== Subdivisions ==
Seven infraspecific taxa are accepted:

- Myristica inutilis var. foremaniana W.J.de Wilde – eastern New Guinea
- Myristica inutilis subsp. inutilis (syn. Palala inutilis Kuntze) – Solomon Islands, Vanuatu, Wallis and Futuna, and Samoan Islands
- Myristica inutilis f. mesophylla W.J.de Wilde – Solomon Islands and Vanuatu
- Myristica inutilis f. nanophylla W.J.de Wilde – Solomon Islands
- Myristica inutilis subsp. papuana (Markgr.) W.J.de Wilde (syns. Myristica fatua var. papuana Markgr., Myristica inutilis var. papuana (Markgr.) W.J.de Wilde, Myristica finschii Warb., Myristica sericea Warb., and Myristica wallaceana Warb.) – Bismarck Archipelago and New Guinea
- Myristica inutilis subsp. platyphylla (A.C.Sm.) W.J.de Wilde – Solomon Islands
- Myristica inutilis f. procera (A.C.Sm.) W.J.de Wilde – Solomon Islands
