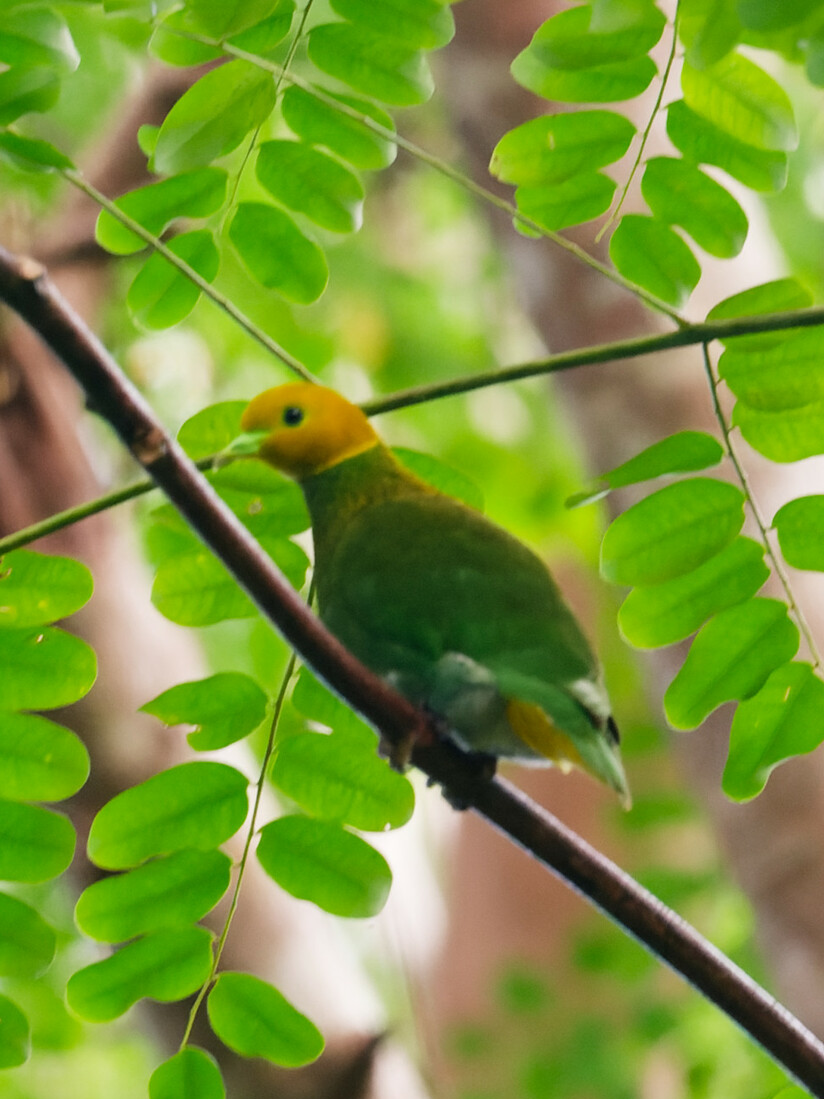

Conservation status
- Near Threatened (IUCN 3.1)

Scientific classification
- Kingdom: Animalia
- Phylum: Chordata
- Class: Aves
- Order: Columbiformes
- Family: Columbidae
- Genus: Ptilinopus
- Species: P. layardi

Binomial name
- Ptilinopus layardi Elliot, 1878

Synonyms
- Chrysoenas layardi

= Whistling dove =

Species of bird

The whistling dove (Ptilinopus layardi), also known as the whistling fruit dove, velvet dove or yellow-headed dove, is a small fruit dove from Fiji. The species is endemic to the islands of Kadavu and Ono in the Kadavu Group in the south of Fiji.

== Taxonomy ==
The whistling dove is the most primitive of the "golden doves", a small subgroup of the genus Ptilinopus which includes two other small Fijian fruit doves, the golden fruit dove and the orange fruit dove. The group was once split into its own genus, Chrysoenas.

== Description ==
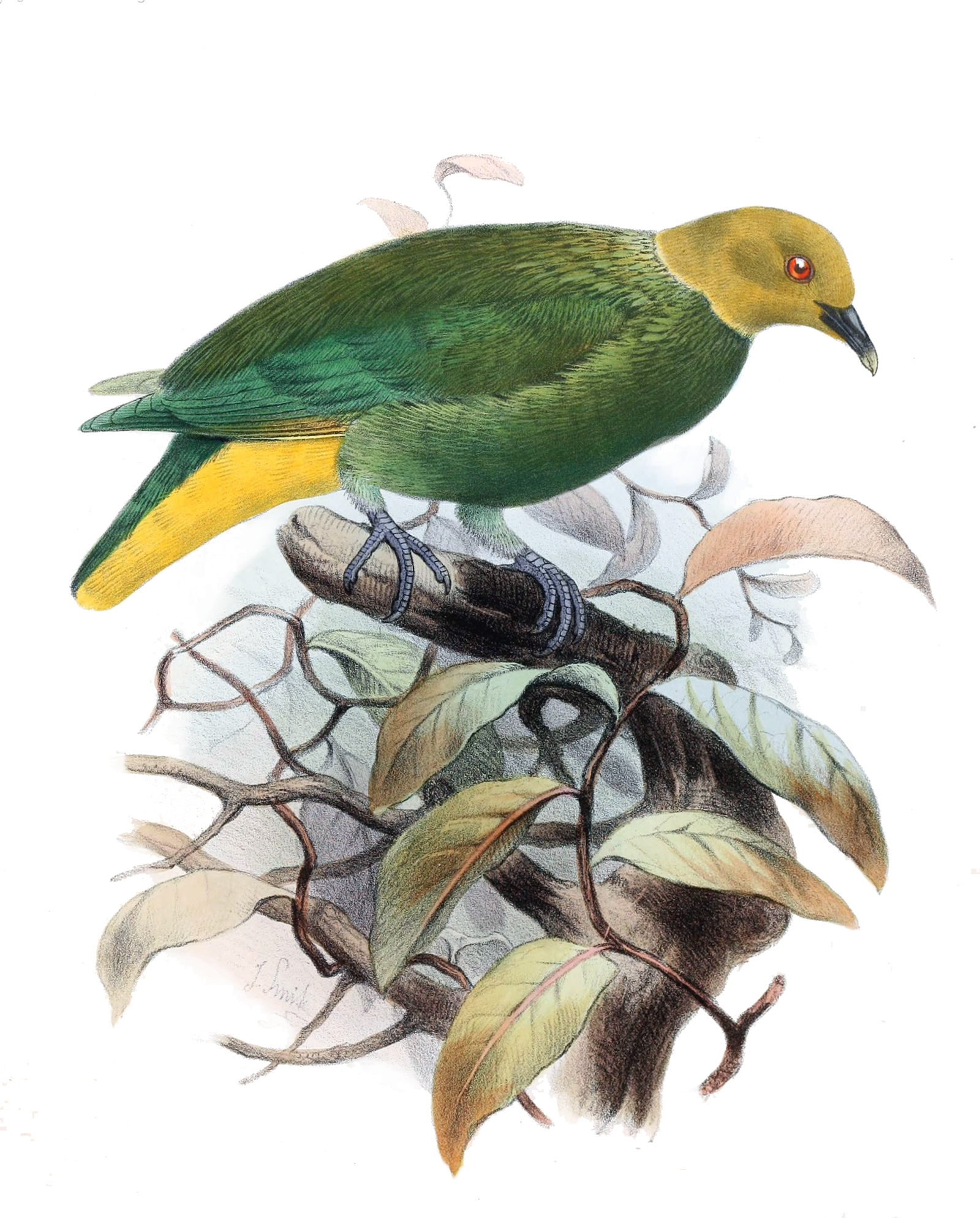
Illustration by Joseph Smit

The whistling dove is a small dove (20 cm (7.9 in)) that is sexually dimorphic in its velvety plumage. The plumage of the male is dark green with a yellow head and undertail coverts, the female lacks the yellow plumage. They are difficult to see in the forest canopy, but can be found due to their distinctive call, a clear rising whistle followed by a falling 'tinkle'.

== Behaviour ==
=== Feeding ===
The species feeds on fruits in the forest canopy.

=== Breeding ===
The breeding of this species has not been studied much. A nest described in 1982 was a 'loose thin platform' constructed with twig-like vines 3 m (9.8 ft) above the ground. A single nestling was described. Only the female took care of the young. If this pattern of parental care is widespread in the golden dove group to which the whistling dove belongs, it represents an unusual adaption within the pigeon family. This difference in the levels of parental care was suggested as an explanation of the sexual dimorphism in the golden doves.

== Conservation ==
The whistling dove is considered near threatened by the IUCN. The species is currently common in the forests of Kadavu and Ono, with an estimated population of 10,000 birds. However it has a restricted range and it is declining due to habitat loss.
