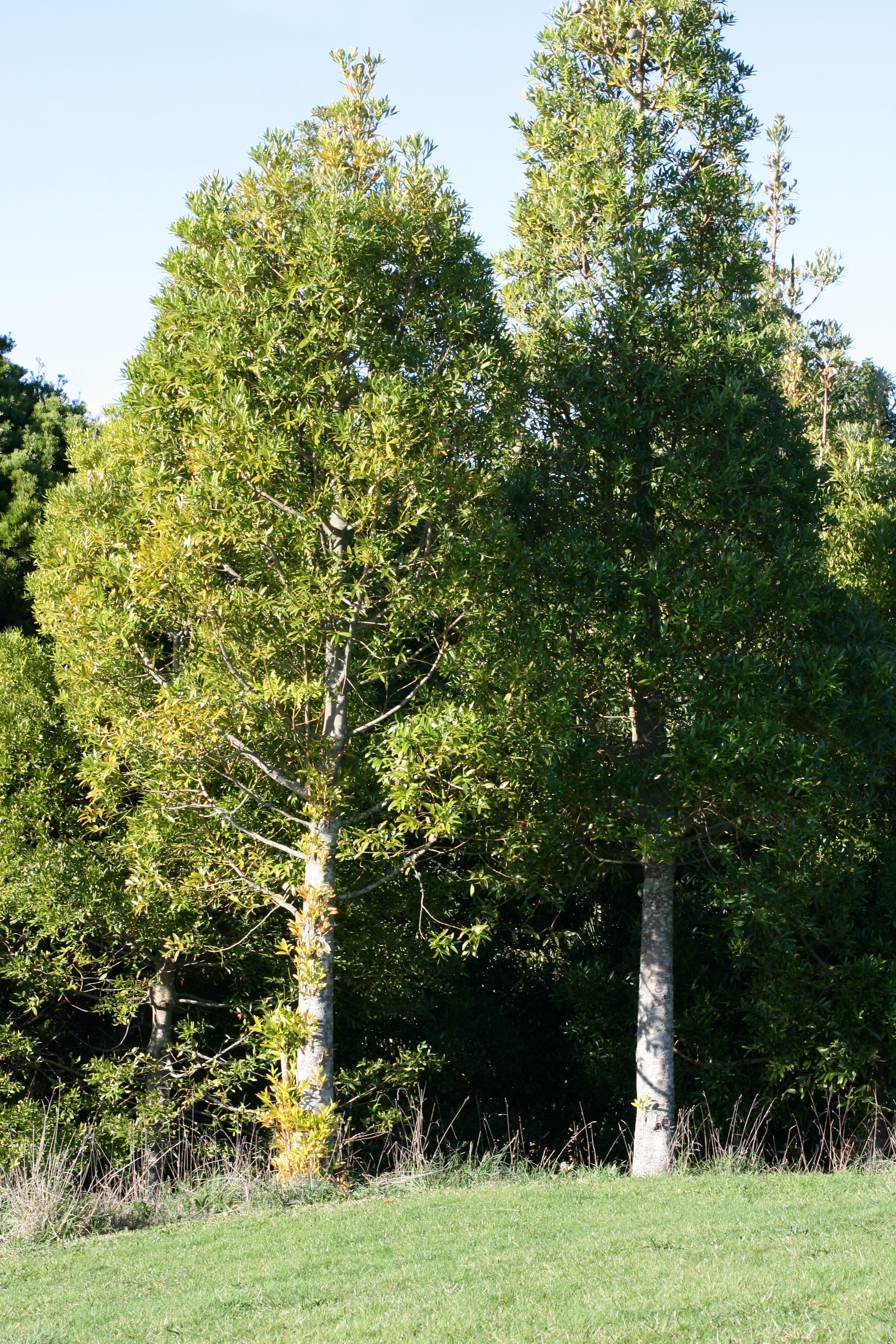
- Young trees at Auckland, New Zealand

Conservation status
- Vulnerable (IUCN 3.1)

Scientific classification
- Kingdom: Plantae
- Clade: Tracheophytes
- Clade: Gymnosperms
- Division: Pinophyta
- Class: Pinopsida
- Order: Araucariales
- Family: Araucariaceae
- Genus: Agathis
- Species: A. macrophylla

Binomial name
- Agathis macrophylla (Lindl.) Mast. (1892)

Synonyms
- Agathis brownii (Lem.) L.H.Bailey (1933); Agathis longifolia (Lindl. ex Gordon) Warb. (1900), not validly publ.; Agathis obtusa (Lindl.) Mast. (1892); Agathis vitiensis (Seem.) Benth. & Hook.f. ex Drake (1892); Dammara longifolia Lindl. ex Gordon (1862), not validly publ.; Dammara macrophylla Lindl. (1851); Dammara obtusa Lindl. (1851); Dammara perousei C.Moore ex Hook. (1852), not validly publ.; Dammara vitiensis Seem. (1868)

= Agathis macrophylla =

Species of conifer

Agathis macrophylla, the Pacific kauri or dakua, is a species of coniferous tree in the family Araucariaceae, native to the islands of the southwestern Pacific Ocean in tropical humid lowlands and lower montane regions, notably in Fiji, Vanuatu, and the Santa Cruz Islands. The Pacific kauri is one of the largest and fastest growing species in its genus, and is important in forestry.

== Description ==
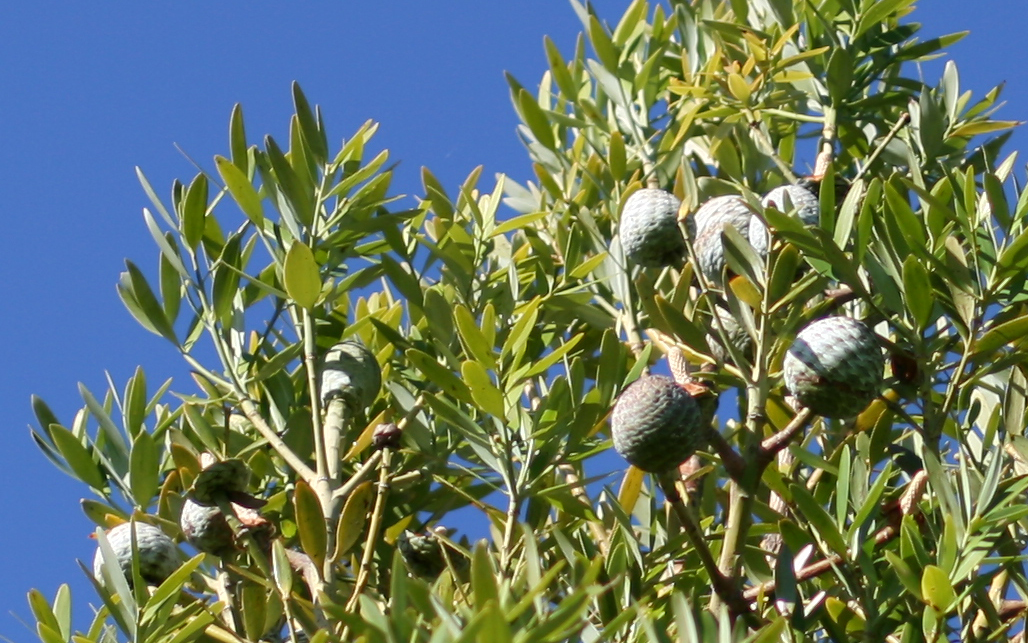
Female cones of Agathis macrophylla

It is a large tree, reaching 40 m in height and 3 m in diameter. It possesses the mottled, shedding bark that is characteristic of other kauri species. Young trees are narrow and conic in shape, but begin to grow a wider, deeper canopy after attaining a trunk diameter of 30–50 cm. In mature specimens, the trunk is generally straight or slightly tapered and clear for 15–20 m before branching into a spreading canopy up to 35 m in diameter. The root system is deep and strong, and the trees are highly wind resistant.

The leaves are green and glossy, elliptical to lanceolate, 7–15 cm long and 2–4 cm wide. They are borne on short petioles and held in a decussate pairs, but twisted so they lie in one plane. Leaves in the shade, of juvenile trees, and of individuals growing in wetter regions, tend to be larger.

Male cones of A. macrophylla are elliptical and measure roughly 2–5 cm long at pollen shed. The short pollen cones help distinguish this species from related Agathis species. Female (seed) cones are globular, 8–13 cm across, and are borne on short woody stalks. The majority of the cone crop matures early to mid February, as the cones turn brown and release the winged seeds, which are small, flattened, and attached to a wing about 3.5 cm in length. Wind dispersal is very efficient; seeds have been known to travel tens of kilometres in the wind, and may even travel hundreds of kilometres during the tropical cyclones that occur frequently in the species' range.

== Ecology ==
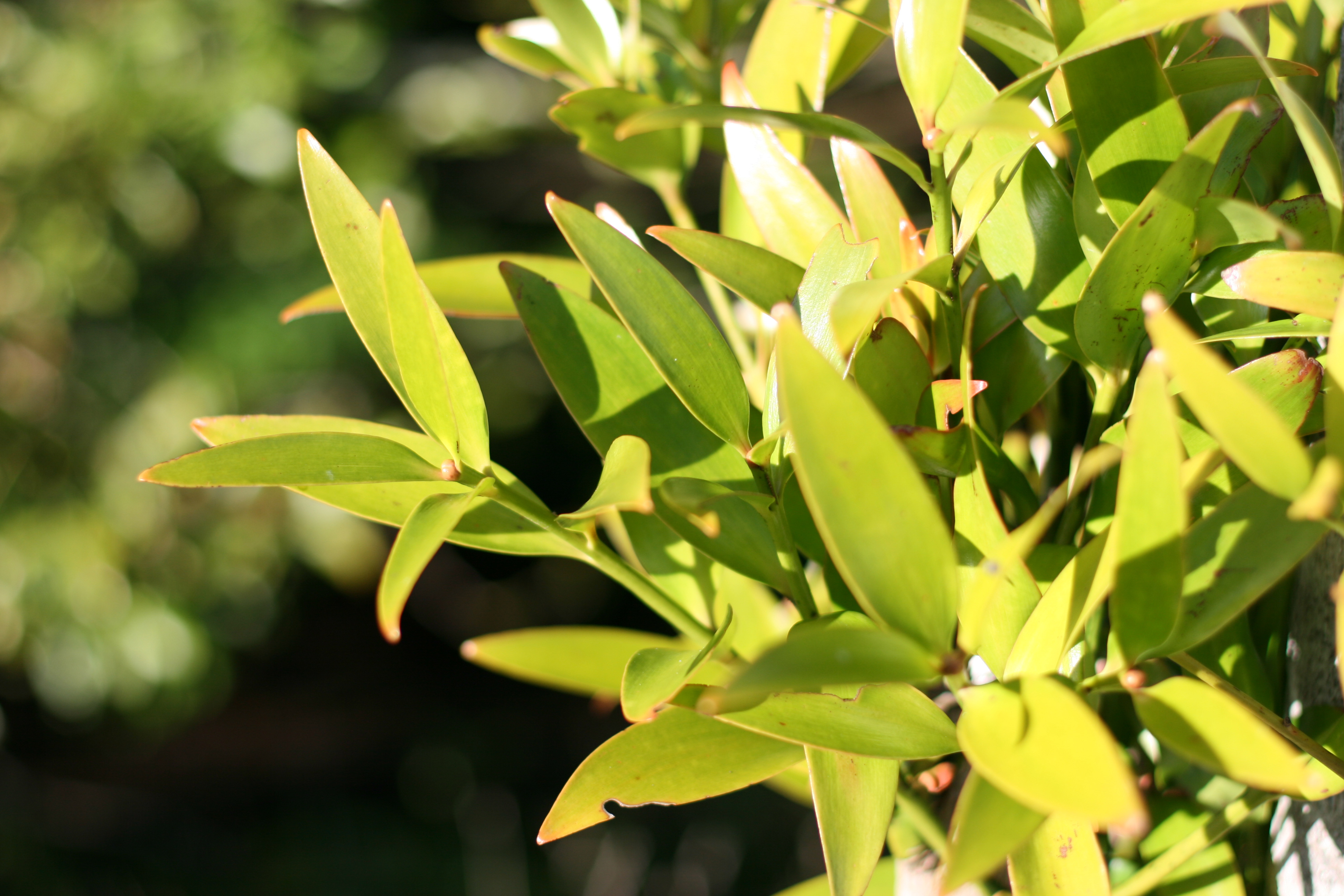
Foliage of Agathis macrophylla

A. macrophylla is one of the largest trees in its range, and occurs as a dominant emergent tree in closed, humid, lowland-montane tropical forests. Associated plant species vary from location to location, but include Cryptocarya turbinata, Ilex vitiensis, Garcinia vitiensis, Palaquium spp., and Podocarpus spp. in Vanuatu, Calophyllum vitiense, Dacrydium nidulum, Retrophyllum vitiense, Fagraea berteroana, and Podocarpus spp. in Fiji.

It is one of the fastest growing species in the genus Agathis, capable of growing 1-1.5 metres in height annually in lightly shaded to open areas, where growth is fastest. The species is fairly shade tolerant, especially in the seedling stage, though growth is slow under suppression. Strong root systems enable mature trees to withstand cyclones and seed rapidly into gaps. The species on the whole is long lived, capable of reaching ages of 300–1000 years.

== Uses ==
A. macrophylla is a valued commercial timber species, and its wood is much sought after for many uses. The wood is a cream to gold colour (mature heartwood is a lustrous brown) and much appreciated in the timber industry, particularly as a surface veneer. The dry wood has a density of approximately 540 kg/m^{3}.

Pacific kauri is a valuable tree throughout the southeastern Pacific (Melanesia). The timber is frequently used for house construction, canoe carving, and totem pole construction. Smoke from the resin is used as a black dye for hair, clothes and tattoos, and the leaves are used in traditional medicine. Fijians value the resin itself (known as makadre) to be used as pottery glaze and torch fuel.

== See also ==
- Agathis australis, New Zealand kauri

== Notes ==
- Lex J. Thompson (2006). "Agathis macrophylla (Pacific kauri), ver. 1.2" (PDF). Species Profiles for Pacific Island Agroforestry. Edited by C.R. Elevitch. Permanent Agricultural Resources (PAR) Holualoa, Hawaii. Archived (PDF) from the original on 24 July 2007.
- R. Thaman; C.R. Elevitch; K.M. Wilkinson, eds. (2000). "Multipurpose trees for agroforestry in the Pacific islands" (PDF). Agroforestry Guides for Pacific islands #2. Permanent Agricultural Resources (PAR) Holualoa, Hawaii.
