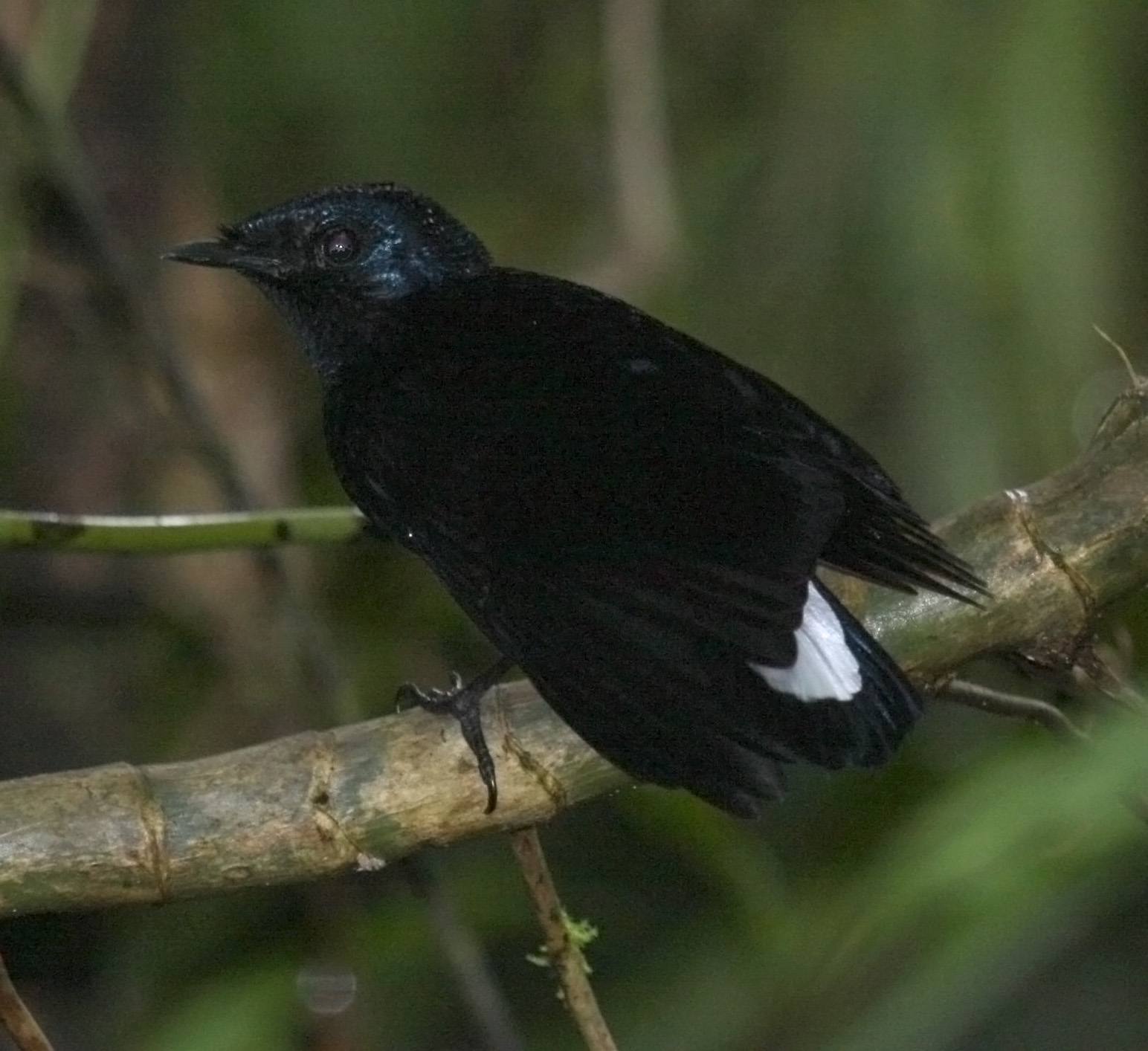

Conservation status
- Near Threatened (IUCN 3.1)

Scientific classification
- Kingdom: Animalia
- Phylum: Chordata
- Class: Aves
- Order: Passeriformes
- Family: Rhipiduridae
- Genus: Lamprolia
- Species: L. victoriae

Binomial name
- Lamprolia victoriae Finsch, 1874

= Taveuni silktail =

Species of bird

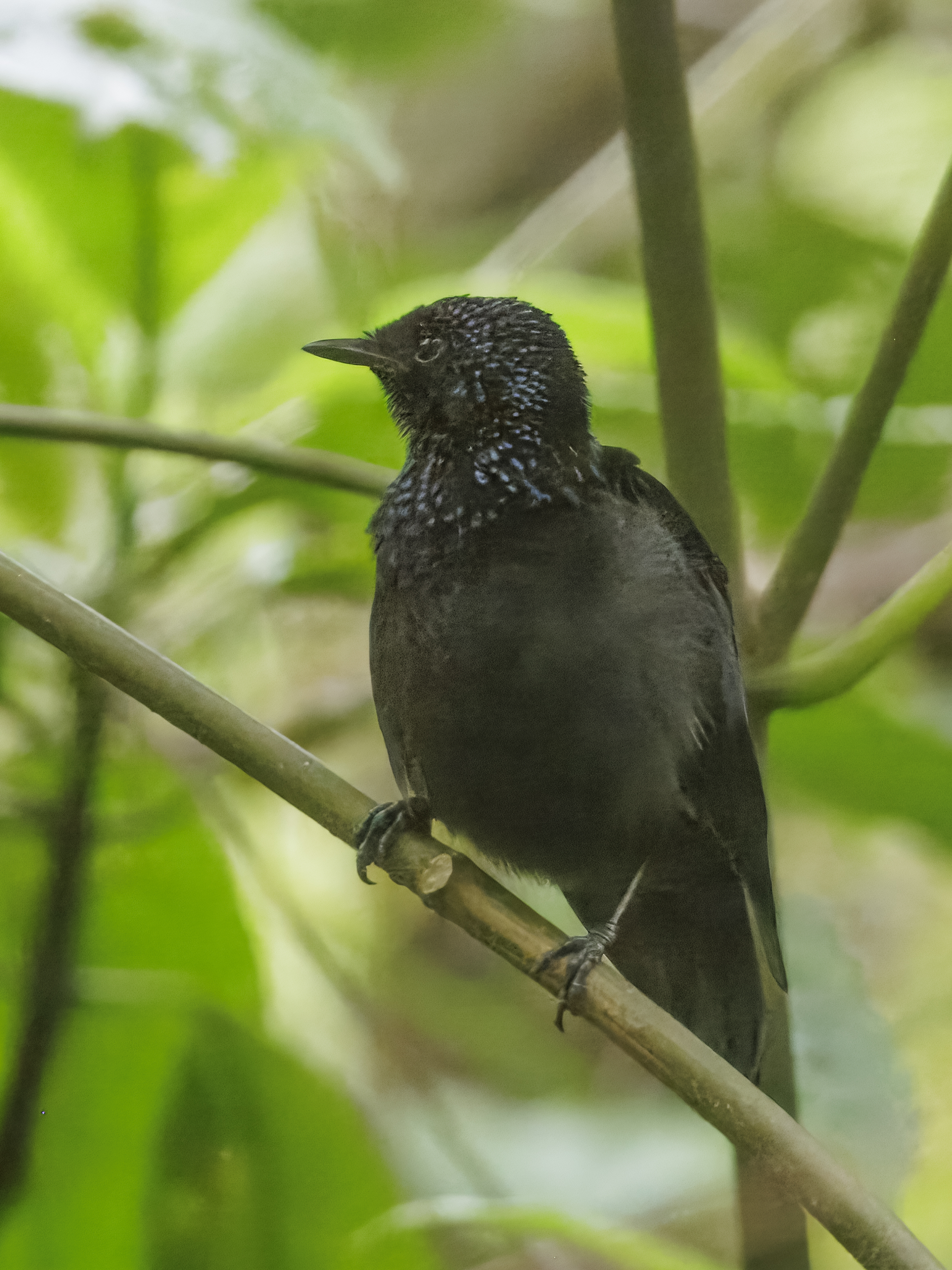

The Taveuni silktail (Lamprolia victoriae) is a species of bird endemic to Fiji. This beautiful bird looks superficially like a diminutive bird-of-paradise but it is actually closely related to the fantails.

Finsch named the species after Victoria, eldest daughter of Queen Victoria, who was then Crown Princess of Germany.

== Description ==
The Taveuni silktail is a small black bird, measuring around 12 centimetres (4.7 in) and weighing 16 to 21 g (0.56–0.74 oz). It is a small, dumpy bird with long rounded wings, and a short rounded tail. The plumage of the male is velvet black with metallic blue iridescent spangling on the crown and breast, and silky white lower-back patch that travels most of the length down the tail. The margin of the tail is black, sometimes this tip has the same iridescence as other parts of the body. The female is similar to the male, except less glossy, and immature birds are duller than the adults and may have buffy rumps and backs. The irises of this species are dark, and the legs and bill are blackish. The bill is heavy and slightly hooked at the end. The legs are long and the feet strong.

== Distribution and habitat ==
The Taveuni silktail is endemic to forests of Taveuni in Fiji. It occurs widely. It occurs in mature wet rainforests, as well as forest patches, and is also found in human-modified habitats such as logged forests and in plantations near patches of natural forest.

== Behaviour ==
It can be quite elusive and difficult to see, but may also be confiding and approachable. It is usually very active at dawn, and is encountered either singly or in small flocks.

The diet consists mainly of insects, worms and arthropods.

== Status and conservation ==
Vidawa, Taveuni, Fiji Isles (golden whistler calling in background)

The Taveuni silktail is a restricted range species. Forest clearance for mahogany plantations and general forest clearance within its range have led to the species being listed as vulnerable in 1994; however, this was downgraded to near threatened in 2006. While its habitat is being lost, it is not yet severely fragmented. The species occurs within the Ravilevu Nature Reserve and the Bouma National Heritage Park.
