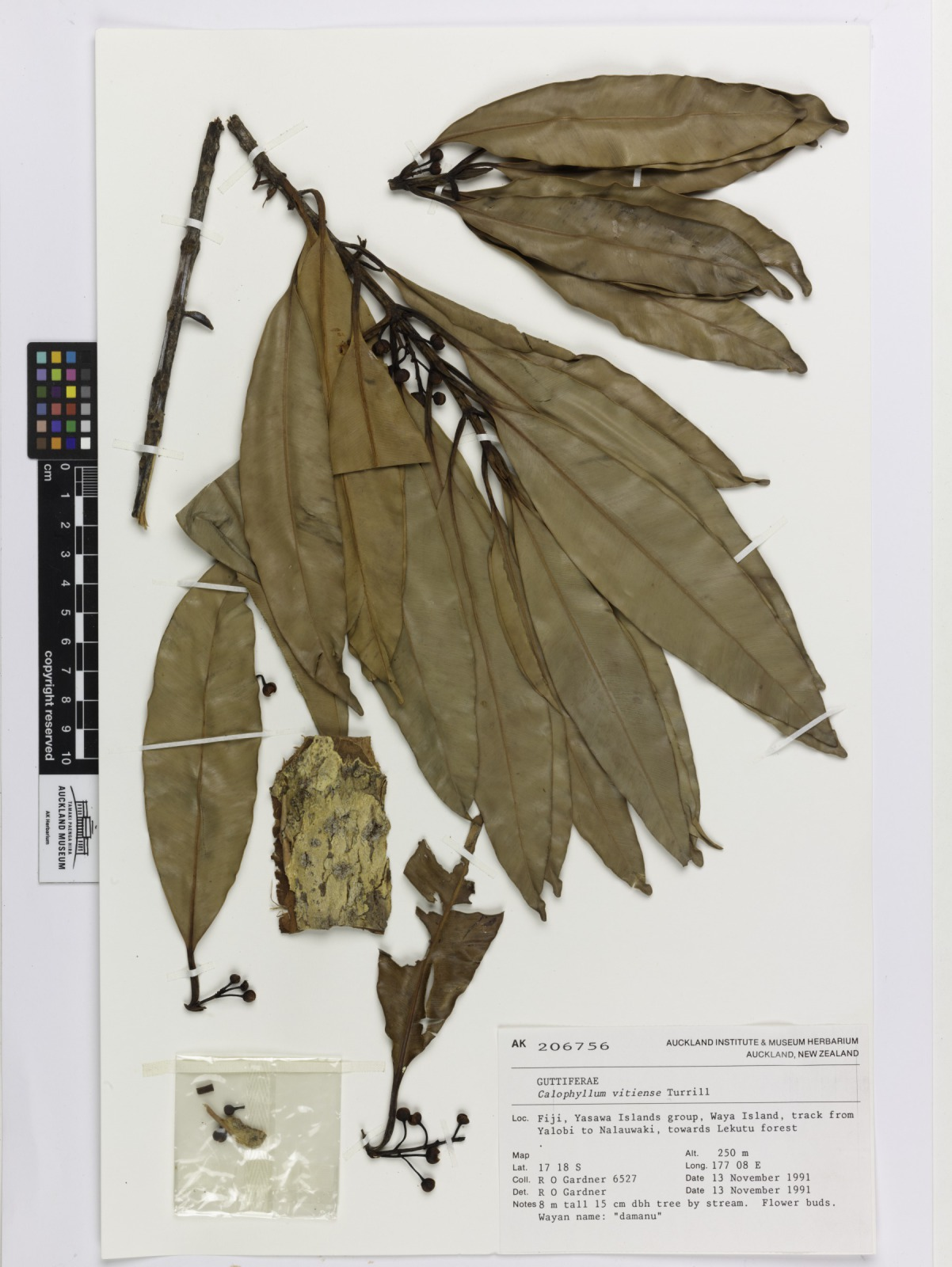

Conservation status
- Least Concern (IUCN 3.1)

Scientific classification
- Kingdom: Plantae
- Clade: Tracheophytes
- Clade: Angiosperms
- Clade: Eudicots
- Clade: Rosids
- Order: Malpighiales
- Family: Calophyllaceae
- Genus: Calophyllum
- Species: C. vitiense

Binomial name
- Calophyllum vitiense Turrill (1915)

Synonyms
- Calophyllum tenuicrustosum A.C.Sm. & S.P.Darwin (1974)

= Calophyllum vitiense =

Species of flowering plant

Calophyllum vitiense is a species of flowering plant in the family Calophyllaceae. It is a tree native to Fiji, Niue, the Santa Cruz Islands, Solomon Islands, and Tonga.
