= Myristica castaneifolia =

Conservation status
- Least Concern (IUCN 3.1)

Scientific classification
- Kingdom: Plantae
- Clade: Embryophytes
- Clade: Tracheophytes
- Clade: Spermatophytes
- Clade: Angiosperms
- Clade: Magnoliids
- Order: Magnoliales
- Family: Myristicaceae
- Genus: Myristica
- Species: M. castaneifolia

Binomial name
- Myristica castaneifolia A.Gray (1854)

Synonyms
- Palala castaneifolia (A.Gray) Kuntze (1891)

Species of flowering plant

Myristica castaneifolia is a species of flowering plant in the nutmeg family, Myristicaceae. It is a tree native to Fiji and the Santa Cruz Islands.
