= Vanuatu rain forests =

Coordinates: 15.33°S 166.92°E

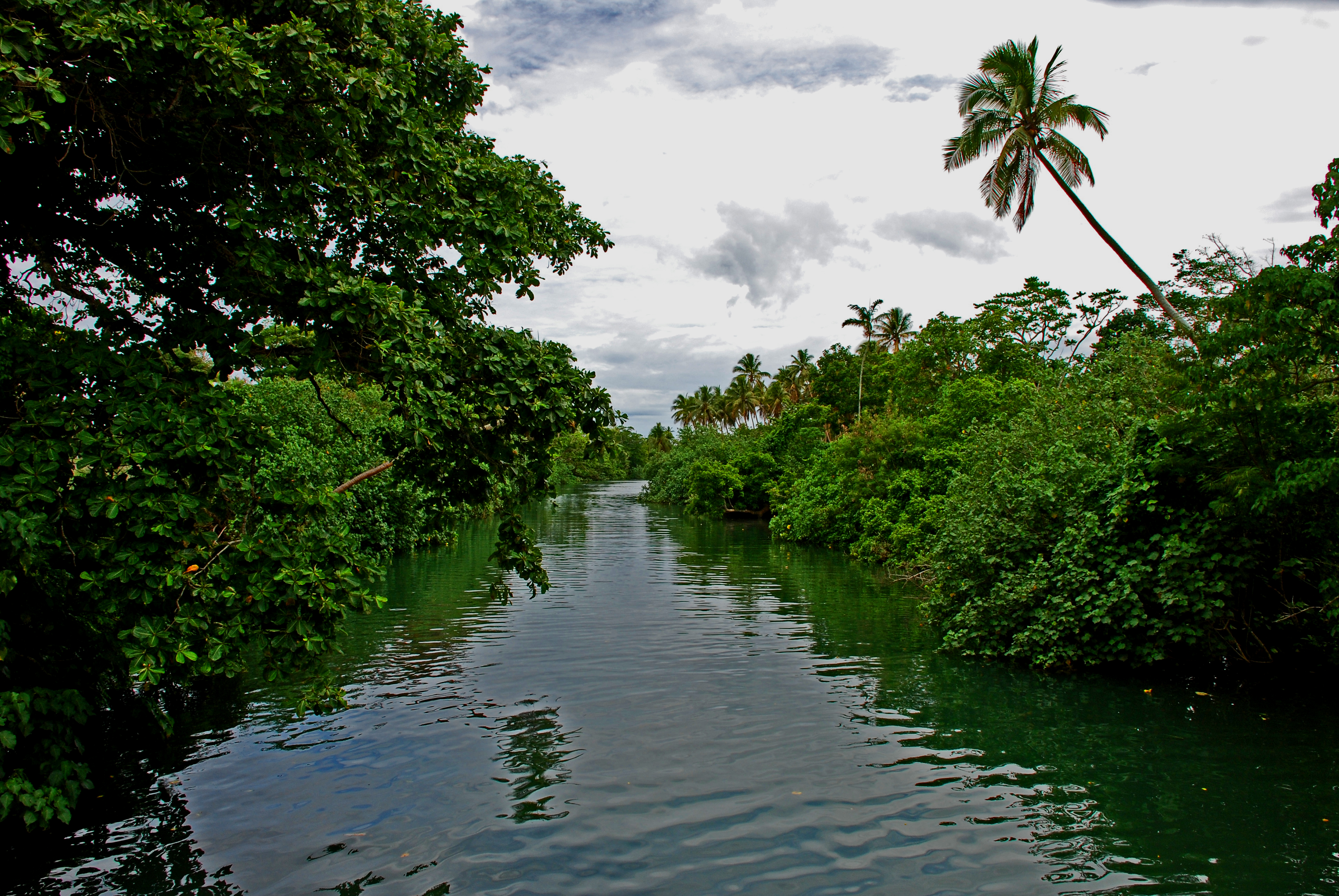
- Neslep River on Efate, Vanuatu

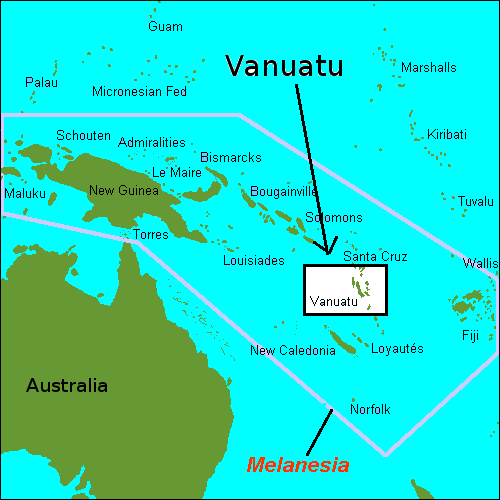

Ecology
- Realm: Australasian realm
- Biome: tropical and subtropical moist broadleaf forests

Geography
- Area: 12,281 km^{2} (4,742 mi^{2})
- Countries: Vanuatu; Solomon Islands
- Provinces of Solomon Islands: Temotu Province

Conservation
- Conservation status: Critical/endangered
- Global 200: Solomons-Vanuatu-Bismarck moist forests
- Protected: 515 km² (4%)

The Vanuatu rain forests are tropical and subtropical moist broadleaf forests ecoregion which includes the islands of Vanuatu, as well as the Santa Cruz Islands group of the neighboring Solomon Islands. It is part of the Australasian realm, which includes neighboring New Caledonia and the Solomon Islands, as well as Australia, New Guinea, and New Zealand.

== Geography ==
The islands were created by the subduction of the northward-moving Australian Plate beneath the Pacific Plate. The surface geology of Vanuatu consists mostly of Pliocene-Pleistocene volcanic rocks and uplifted coral limestone. The Santa Cruz Islands have areas of both uplifted limestone and volcanic ash over limestone. The oldest rocks in Vanuatu are 38 million years old. The Santa Cruz islands are younger, with the oldest rocks less than 5 million years old.

Most of the islands are low-lying. The largest island is Espiritu Santo (3,955.5 km^{2}). The highest peak is Mount Tabwemasana on Espiritu Santo (1,879 m).

Nendö, also known as Santa Cruz, is the largest of the Santa Cruz Islands with an area of 519 km^{2}. Vanikoro is 190 km^{2}, and Utupua is 69 km^{2}. The highest peak in the Santa Cruz islands (924 m) is on Vanikoro. Nendö reaches over 500 meters elevation, and Utupua 350 m. They are made mostly of basaltic volcanic rocks of Pliocene origin, less than 5 million years old. The southeastern lowlands of Nendö are composed of uplifted Pleistocene reef limestone.

Smaller islands in the group include Tinakula (8 km^{2} and 800 meters elevation), a conical active stratovolcano 30 km north of Nendö, and the Reef Islands northeast of Nendö, composed of uplifted Pleistocene reef limestone and rising only 5 meters above sea level. The Duff Islands are a small chain with four main islands about 130 km northeast of Nendö, with a combined area of 14 km^{2} and which rise up to 300 m elevation. Tikopia (5 km^{2}), Anuta (1 km^{2}), and Fataka (5 km^{2}) are small isolated islands east and southeast of Vanikoro.

== Climate ==
The ecoregion has a tropical wet climate. The windward southeastern sides of the islands receive more rainfall. The leeward northwestern slopes of islands have a distinct dry season between April and October. Tropical cyclones occur regularly.

== Flora ==
The natural plant communities on the islands include lowland rain forest, montane rain forest, seasonal forest and scrub, coastal strand, mangroves, vegetation on recent volcanic rocks, and secondary vegetation.

Lowland rain forest occurs on the southeastern, or windward, sides of Vanuatu's islands. There are several lowland rain forest types. Complex forest scrub densely covered with lianas is the most widespread forest type on the larger northern islands. Other types include high- and medium-stature forests, alluvial and floodplain forests, and mixed-species forests without conifers. Agathis-Calophyllum lowland forest is found on the southern islands of Erromango and Aneityum.

Lowland rainforest is the predominant plant community on the Santa Cruz Islands, and has some differences from the lowland rain forests on the islands further south. Typical species include Campnosperma brevipetiolatum, Calophyllum vitiense, Gmelina salomonensis, Maranthes corymbosa, Falcataria falcata, Pterocarpus indicus, and Endospermum medullosum. There is no well-developed montane forest, but the trees Metrosideros vitiensis, Syzygium branderhorstii, Syzygium buettnerianum, Syzygium effusum, Syzygium myriadenum, and Syzygium onesimum, and the conifers Agathis macrophylla and Retrophyllum vitiense, which are typically montane species elsewhere, grow in the islands' lowland forests. Agathis macrophylla grows only on Nendö and Vanikoro, and is found on ridges and slopes as an emergent tree in mixed forests or in monotypic stands.

In Vanuatu, montane rain forests extent from as low as 500 meters elevation up to patches of stunted cloud forest on the islands' highest peaks. They include the conifers Agathis macrophylla and Dacrycarpus imbricatus, together with broadleaf evergreen trees Metrosideros vitiensis, Syzygium spp., Pterophylla spp., Geissois spp., Quintinia spp., and Ascarina spp. The tree ferns Cyathea and Dicksonia are common, and the endemic palm Clinostigma harlandii is found on the islands Ambrym, Aneityum, and Erromango. Podocarpus vanuatuensis is a Vanuatu endemic, native to Aneityum and Erromango. Agathis silbae is endemic to the Cumberland Peninsula and Mount Tabwemasana, also known as Santo Peak, on the west coast of Espiritu Santo, from 450 to 760 meters elevation. It is a large emergent tree in lower mountain rainforest on the wetter western and northwestern slopes of Espiritu Santo's central mountain range, with an average annual rainfall of about 4,500 mm. Associated trees include Calophyllum neo-ebudicum, Cryptocarya turbinata, Didymocheton sp., Myristica sp., and Podocarpus sp. Metrosideros tabwemasanaensis is a tree endemic to the montane forests of Mount Tabwemasana.

Seasonal forest, scrub, and grassland grow on the leeward sides of the islands. Semideciduous Kleinhovia hospita-Castanospermum australe forests are a transition between rain forest and dry forest, and include some rain forest species. Forest of gaiac (Acacia spirorbis) is found in drier areas, with a canopy up to 15 meters high. Thickets and savannas of the introduced tree Leucaena leucocephala and grasslands are also found on the leeward sides of the islands.

Littoral forests include Casuarina equisetifolia, Pandanus spp., Barringtonia asiatica, Terminalia catappa, Hernandia spp., and Thespesia populnea.

Coastal mangrove forests are found on some islands, and contain species of Rhizophora, Avicennia, Sonneratia, Xylocarpus, and Ceriops.

== Fauna ==
Bats are the only native mammals in the ecoregion. There are twelve species – four megabats and eight microbats – five of which are endemic. The four megabats – Vanuatu flying fox (Pteropus anetianus), Temotu flying fox (Pteropus nitendiensis), Vanikoro flying fox (Pteropus tuberculatus), and Banks flying fox (Pteropus fundatus) – are endemic. Native microchiroptera include the Fijian blossom bat (Notopteris macdonaldi), Fijian mastiff bat (Chaerephon bregullae), Pacific sheath-tailed bat (Emballonura semicaudata), large-footed bat (Myotis adversus), little bent-wing bat (Miniopterus australis), great bent-winged bat (Miniopterus tristis), Temminck's trident bat (Aselliscus tricuspidatus), and fawn leaf-nosed bat (Hipposideros cervinus). The endemic Nendo tube-nosed fruit bat (Nyctimene sanctacrucis) is presumed extinct.

The Pacific boa (Candoia bibroni), also known as Bibron's bevel-headed boa, the Solomon Islands boa, or the Pacific ground boa (among several other names), is native to the island and surrounding region. It is unique among Boidae snakes for its "bevel" or "spade"-shaped snout, used for digging; perhaps the closest comparable species would be the Kenyan sand boa, which spends much of its time burrowing, where it will lie in wait to ambush its passing prey above.

There are 79 native bird species in Vanuatu. Fifteen species are endemic – Vanuatu scrubfowl (Megapodius layardi), Santa Cruz ground-dove (Gallicolumba sanctaecrucis), Tanna ground-dove (Gallicolumba ferruginea), Tanna fruit-dove (Ptilinopus tannensis), Baker's imperial pigeon (Ducula bakeri), palm lorikeet (Charmosyna palmarum), chestnut-bellied kingfisher (Todirhamphus farquhari), Vanikoro monarch (Mayrornis schistaceus), buff-bellied monarch (Neolalage banksiana), black-throated shrikebill (Clytorhynchus nigrogularis), Vanikoro flycatcher (Myiagra vanikorensis), Santa Cruz white-eye (Zosterops santaecrucis), yellow-fronted white-eye (Zosterops flavifrons), Sanford's white-eye (Woodfordia lacertosa), New Hebrides honeyeater (Phylidonyris notabilis), royal parrotfinch (Erythrura regia), Polynesian starling (Aplonis tabuensis), rusty-winged starling (Aplonis zelandica), and Mountain starling (Aplonis santovestris). The ecoregion corresponds to the Vanuatu and Temotu endemic bird area.

== Conservation ==
4.3%, or approximately 515 km^{2}, of the ecoregion is in protected areas. Protected areas include:

- Ambrym Megapode Reserve
- Central Efate (Teouma) Forest Conservation Area
- Erromango Kauri Forest Conservation Area
- Lasenuwi Forest Conservation Area
- Loru Protected Area
- Pankumo Protected Area
- Vatthe Forest Conservation Area
- Western Peninsular Forest Conservation Area
- Wiawi Conservation Area
