= Vatthe Conservation Area =

Protected area in Espiritu Santo, Vanuatu

Vatthe Conservation Park
- Vatthe Conservation Area
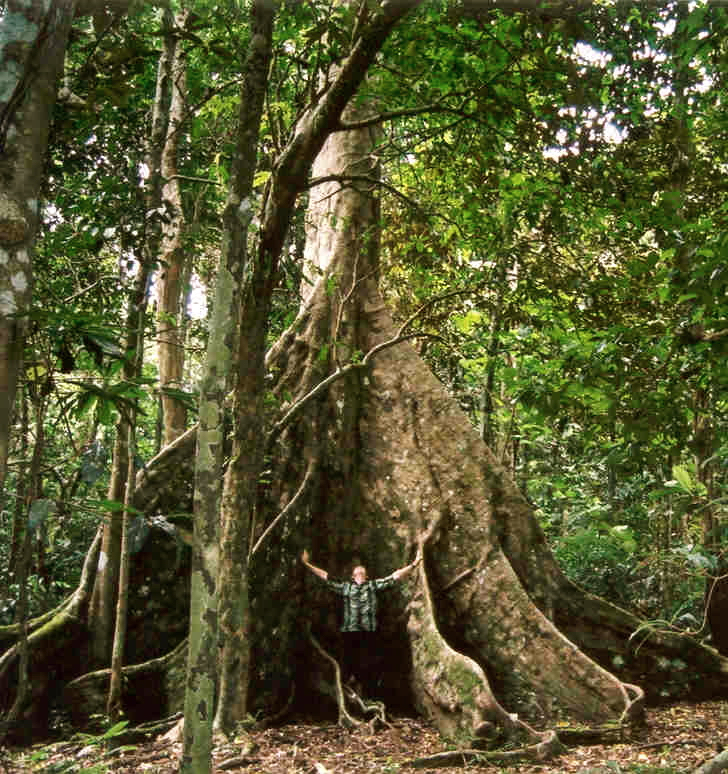
- A nakatambol tree (Dracontomelon vitiense) in the park
- Interactive map of Vatthe Conservation Park
- Location: Espiritu Santo, Sanma Province, Vanuatu
- Nearest city: Luganville
- Coordinates: 15°18′22″S 166°54′53″E
- Area: 2,720 ha (10.5 sq mi)
- Established: 1994

The Vatthe Conservation Park, also called the Vatthe Conservation Area, is a community-managed protected area on the north coast of Espiritu Santo, the largest island of Vanuatu. It lies at Big Bay in Sanma Province and covers about 2,720 hectares (6,700 acres) of lowland forest on alluvial soils and raised limestone. The area was established in 1994 and in June 2004 became the first conservation area registered under Vanuatu's Environmental Management and Conservation Act 2002. It has been on Vanuatu's tentative list for World Heritage status since 1 October 2004.

== History ==
The name Vatthe means "eye of the sea" in the local language. The idea of protecting the area followed biodiversity surveys carried out in 1993 by the Vanuatu Environment Unit and the Royal Forest and Bird Protection Society of New Zealand, which recorded the birds of the area. In the same year Anthony H. Whitaker surveyed the reptiles of Vanuatu, and a decade later Philippe Keith surveyed the fish of the Matantas River.

In 1994 the Vatthe Conservation Area Project was launched with funding from the South Pacific Biodiversity Conservation Programme, administered by the South Pacific Regional Environment Programme. A land dispute between the traditional owners meant that the project initially had little community support; in 1995 the two families settled the dispute and abandoned plans to log the area. In 1996 the communities formed a joint Conservation Area Community Committee.

The project provided training so that the villages could manage the area themselves, and it funded infrastructure including solar lighting, a water well, improved sanitation and radio-telephone links. Local guides were trained and a handicrafts centre and tourist bungalows were completed in 1997.

Vatthe was registered in June 2004 under the Environmental Management and Conservation Act 2002, the first conservation area to be registered under that act, and registration required the communities to prepare a conservation management plan. Vanuatu submitted the area to the World Heritage tentative list on 1 October 2004, under criteria (vii), (ix) and (x).

Several other Vanuatu sites appear on the tentative list: Yalo, Apialo and the sacred geography of north-west Malakula; the wreck of the liner President Coolidge, sunk in 1942; Lake Letas; and the Nowon and Votwos site on Ureparapara. Chief Roi Mata's Domain was inscribed as a World Heritage Site in 2008.

== Geography and geology ==
Espiritu Santo, with the park on the north coast at Big Bay

The park lies on the north coast of Espiritu Santo at Big Bay. It extends west to the Jordan River, one of the largest rivers in Vanuatu, and south across the bay's black sand beach and the Matantas River, reaching four kilometres inland to the top of a raised limestone cliff 400 metres (1,300 ft) above sea level.

Espiritu Santo covers 3,677 square kilometres (1,420 sq mi) and is volcanic in origin, with a mountain range along its west coast rising to Mount Tabwemasana at 1,879 metres (6,165 ft), the highest point in the country. The island lies close to the boundary of the Australian and Pacific plates, and uplifted coral terraces occur along many parts of its coastline; uplift rates of between 2 and 6 mm a year have been measured, the highest on the west coast.

UNESCO gives the area as 2,720 hectares (6,700 acres); a study of protected-area management in Vanuatu gives 2,276 hectares (5,620 acres) of lowland alluvial rainforest. A later project description gives 2,500 hectares (6,200 acres) of lowland forest. The World Heritage nomination states that the area contains the only extensive alluvial and limestone forest left in Vanuatu, and the National Biodiversity Strategy and Action Plan describes it in similar terms.

Vanuatu has a tropical climate with a warm, wet season from November to April and a cooler, dry season from May to October. Annual average temperatures are between 23.5 and 27.5 °C (74.3 and 81.5 °F). Tropical cyclones occur between November and April.

The park lies in the Vanuatu rain forests ecoregion, which covers more than eighty islands of volcanic or uplifted limestone origin. The mountainous interior of the island forms the Santo Mountain Chain Key Biodiversity Area, one of 27 in the country, designated for species including the endangered Santa Cruz ground dove and mountain starling; the park itself lies on the coastal lowlands below it.

== Flora and fauna ==
UNESCO describes the vegetation as falling into seven broad plant communities: alluvial plain forest, species-rich forest, species-poor Namatal forest with Kleinhovia hospita, nakatambol forest with Dracontomelon vitiense, bin-tri forest of Antiaris toxicaria, swamp forest, coral limestone forest, savanna and the riparian vegetation of the Jordan River. Some 265 species of trees, shrubs, palms and vines with traditional uses have been identified in the area. The species-rich forest is dominated by melektri (Antiaris toxicaria).

=== Mammals ===
Three caves in the park serve as roosts for bats. Five species have been recorded: two fruit bats, the Pacific flying fox and the Vanuatu flying fox (Pteropus anetianus), and three insectivorous bats, the Temminck's trident bat (Aselliscus tricuspidatus), the fawn leaf-nosed bat (Hipposideros cervinus) and the little bent-wing bat (Miniopterus australis). The Vanuatu flying fox is endemic to the country.

=== Birds ===
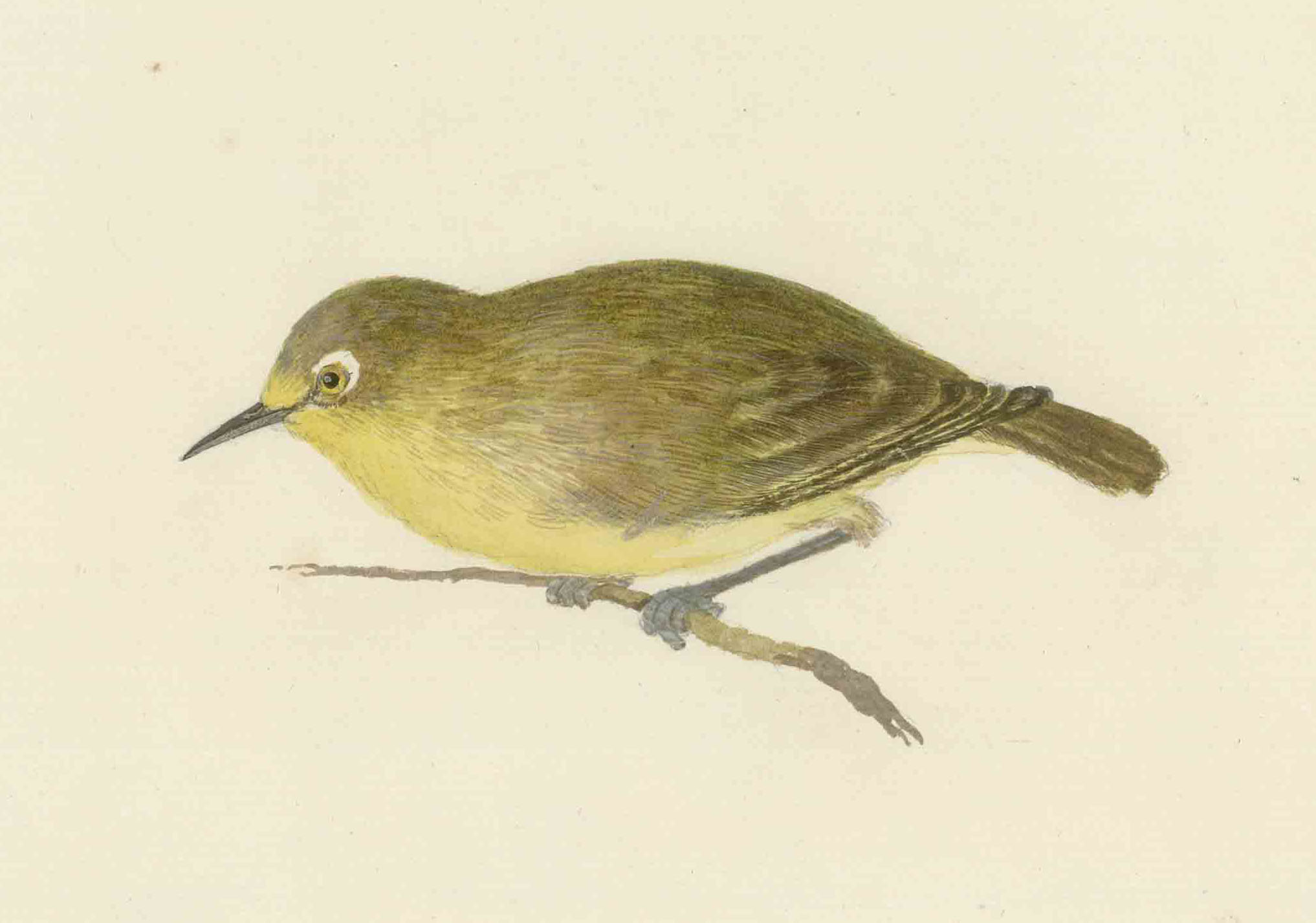
Zosterops flavifrons, the Vanuatu white-eye, painted by Georg Forster in the 1770s

A survey by the Royal Forest and Bird Protection Society of New Zealand in 1993 recorded 48 of the 74 species of land and freshwater birds known from Vanuatu in the area. Six of Vanuatu's nine endemic land birds are known from the forest. The World Heritage nomination lists the Vanuatu imperial pigeon (Ducula bakeri), the Vanuatu megapode (Megapodius layardi), the Vanuatu white-eye (Zosterops flavifrons), the Tanna fruit dove (Ptilinopus tannensis) and the New Hebrides honeyeater (Phylidonyris notabilis). The buff-bellied monarch (Neolalage banksiana), the only bird genus endemic to Vanuatu, is common in the park.

Vanuatu's National Biodiversity Strategy and Action Plan, a separate national source, gives a partly different list: it names the globally endangered Santa Cruz ground dove (Pampusana sanctaecrucis) along with the Vanuatu megapode, the royal parrotfinch and the Vanuatu kingfisher. The megapode, known locally as the namalaus, is listed as a priority species in the IUCN megapode action plan because of habitat loss and over-exploitation.

=== Reptiles ===
Whitaker's 1993 study of Vanuatu's reptiles found 10 of the 12 reptile species recorded on Espiritu Santo in the park. Three are endemic: Cryptoblepharus novohebridicus, Emoia nigromarginata and Emoia sanfordi, out of six endemic reptiles known from Vanuatu.

=== Fish ===
Keith's 2003 survey of the Matantas River recorded 21 of the 62 freshwater fish species known from Vanuatu, three of them endemic. These include Schismatogobius vanuatuensis and species of Microphis and Stenogobius that were still awaiting description; the survey also recorded 13 species of crustaceans, and Keith considered the whole Jordan River catchment important for freshwater biodiversity. His paper in the Journal of Fish Biology sets out the biology of the amphidromous gobies that these fish belong to.

== Local communities ==
The land belongs to traditional families living in the Sara and Matantas villages near the park. The forest supplies them with food, building materials, medicine and sites for customary ceremony, and the conservation area holds many tabu sites. Families harvest nangai nuts (Canarium indicum) and bin-tri seeds, which they sell in local markets, and black beans are also harvested for sale.

One of the bat caves is tabu and may be entered only by the high chief of Matantas after a customary ceremony. Local tradition holds that the forest is guarded by Alawuro, a snake spirit who lives in a cave in the limestone cliff above it, sees everything that happens in the bay and rides to the villages on a white horse to warn them when he is displeased. The nomination records that villagers credit him with having kept the forest from being cleared.

== Management ==
The Conservation Area Community Committee, formed in 1996, manages the area with the villages. The conservation management plan required at registration prohibits the killing of certain species while permitting limited hunting of others. Local monitors oversee all harvesting and can impose fines or order community service, and persistent offenders can be taken to court. The plan also allows most traditional uses of the forest to continue, including the collection of medicinal plants and timber for canoes, firewood and houses.

Vatthe was the first conservation area registered under the Environmental Management and Conservation Act 2002, and Vanuatu's National Biodiversity Strategy and Action Plan names it among the conservation areas to be used as national role models. The World Database on Protected Areas lists four formal protected areas in Vanuatu covering 98 square kilometres (38 sq mi), about 1 per cent of the land area, and Vatthe is one of them. Sanma Province, where the park lies, has four registered conservation areas. The registered site covers both terrestrial and marine areas.

== Conservation issues ==
The main threats to biodiversity on Espiritu Santo are habitat loss, invasive species and extreme weather. Logging was the main pressure on the forest, and the traditional owners abandoned plans to log it in 1995.

The invasive vine Decalobanthus peltatus, formerly Merremia peltata, has spread through the forest. It grew vigorously after three cyclones and by 2010 had invaded about 2,300 hectares (5,700 acres), or 92 per cent of the forest, of which some 1,700 hectares (4,200 acres) were beyond the communities' capacity to control. A UNDP Small Grants Programme project running from 2010 to 2013 trialled low-cost control methods, including cutting and stem injection of herbicide, and aimed to clear about 600 hectares (1,500 acres). The National Biodiversity Strategy and Action Plan names the vine at Vatthe as a threat to the endangered Santa Cruz ground dove.

Nationally, hunting and exploitation affect 66 per cent of Vanuatu's threatened species, and land-use conflicts including logging in the lowlands constrain protected-area management. Vanuatu is regularly struck by cyclones, which cause blowdowns and landslips in its forests.

== Economy ==
The conservation project aimed to train the communities to manage the area themselves and to provide alternative sustainable livelihoods. Ecotourism was the focus: local guides were trained, and a handicrafts centre and tourist bungalows were completed in 1997. The forest remains the main attraction for the bungalows at Matantas.

The Bay of Illusions Guesthouse at Matantas describes itself as the entrance to the conservation area and runs guided walks ranging from a two-hour walk to the nakatambol trees to three-day treks.
