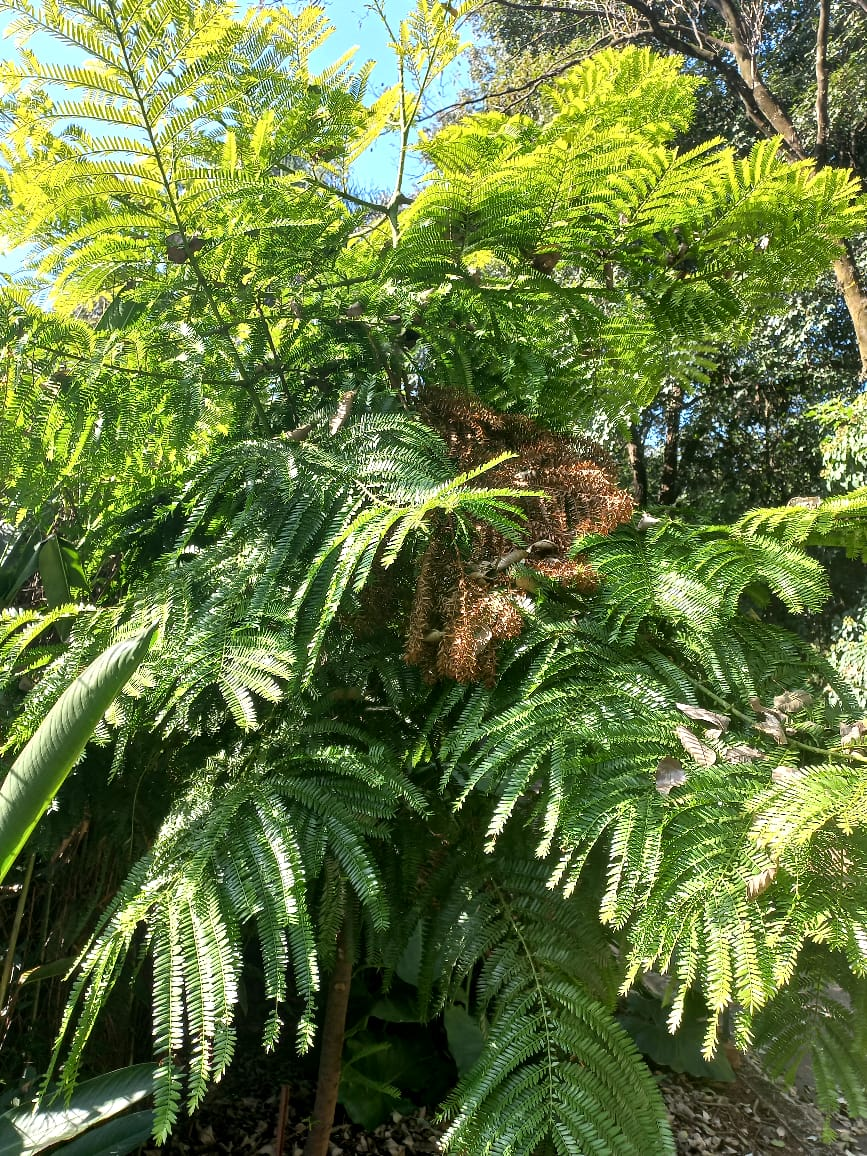

Conservation status
- Data Deficient (IUCN 3.1)

Scientific classification
- Kingdom: Plantae
- Clade: Tracheophytes
- Clade: Gymnosperms
- Division: Pinophyta
- Class: Pinopsida
- Order: Araucariales
- Family: Podocarpaceae
- Genus: Retrophyllum
- Species: R. piresii

Binomial name
- Retrophyllum piresii Silba C.N. Page

= Retrophyllum piresii =

Species of conifer

Retrophyllum piresii is a species of coniferous tree in the family Podocarpaceae. It is native to Brazil.
