= Podocarpus vanuatuensis =

Scientific classification
- Kingdom: Plantae
- Clade: Tracheophytes
- Clade: Gymnosperms
- Division: Pinophyta
- Class: Pinopsida
- Order: Araucariales
- Family: Podocarpaceae
- Genus: Podocarpus
- Species: P. vanuatuensis

Binomial name
- Podocarpus vanuatuensis de Laub. (2015)

Species of conifer

Podocarpus vanuatuensis is a species of conifer in the family Podocarpaceae, endemic to Vanuatu. It is a small tree, growing up to 8 meters tall. It grows in low-elevation rainforests on the islands of Aneityum and Erromango.
