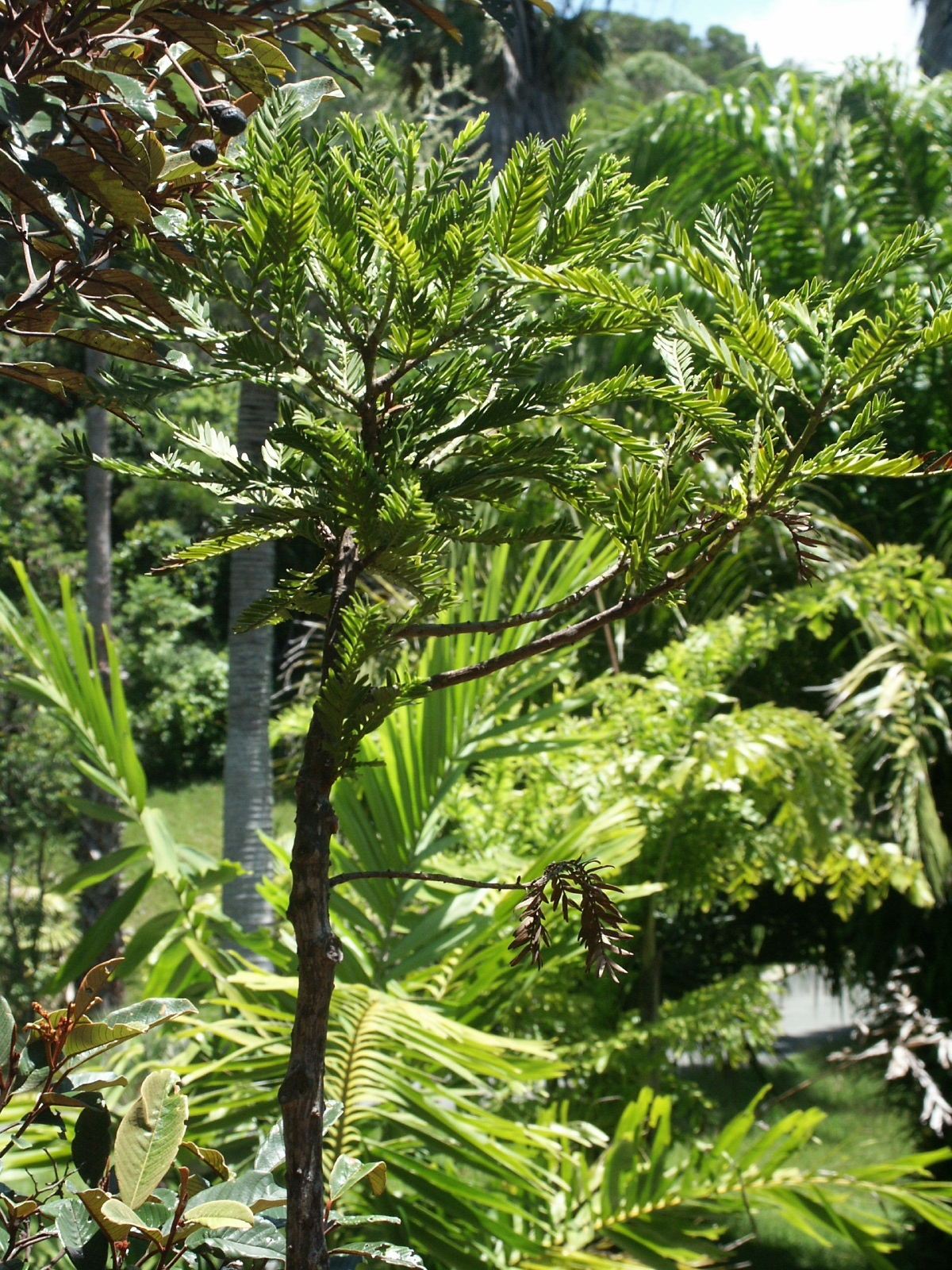

Conservation status
- Least Concern (IUCN 3.1)

Scientific classification
- Kingdom: Plantae
- Clade: Tracheophytes
- Clade: Gymnosperms
- Division: Pinophyta
- Class: Pinopsida
- Order: Araucariales
- Family: Podocarpaceae
- Genus: Retrophyllum
- Species: R. comptonii

Binomial name
- Retrophyllum comptonii (J.Buchholz) C.N.Page

Synonyms
- Decussocarpus comptonii (J.Buchholz) de Laub.; Nageia comptonii (J.Buchholz) de Laub.; Podocarpus comptonii J.Buchholz

= Retrophyllum comptonii =

Species of conifer

Retrophyllum comptonii is a species of conifer in the family Podocarpaceae. It is a tree endemic to New Caledonia.

It is native to Grande Terre, New Caledonia's main island, where it ranges from Port Boise in the far south to Mont Ignambi on the northeast coast. It grows in montane rain forest and shrubland (maquis), on both ultramafic and schist substrates, from 700 to 1,450 metres elevation, and occasionally as low as 200 meters.
