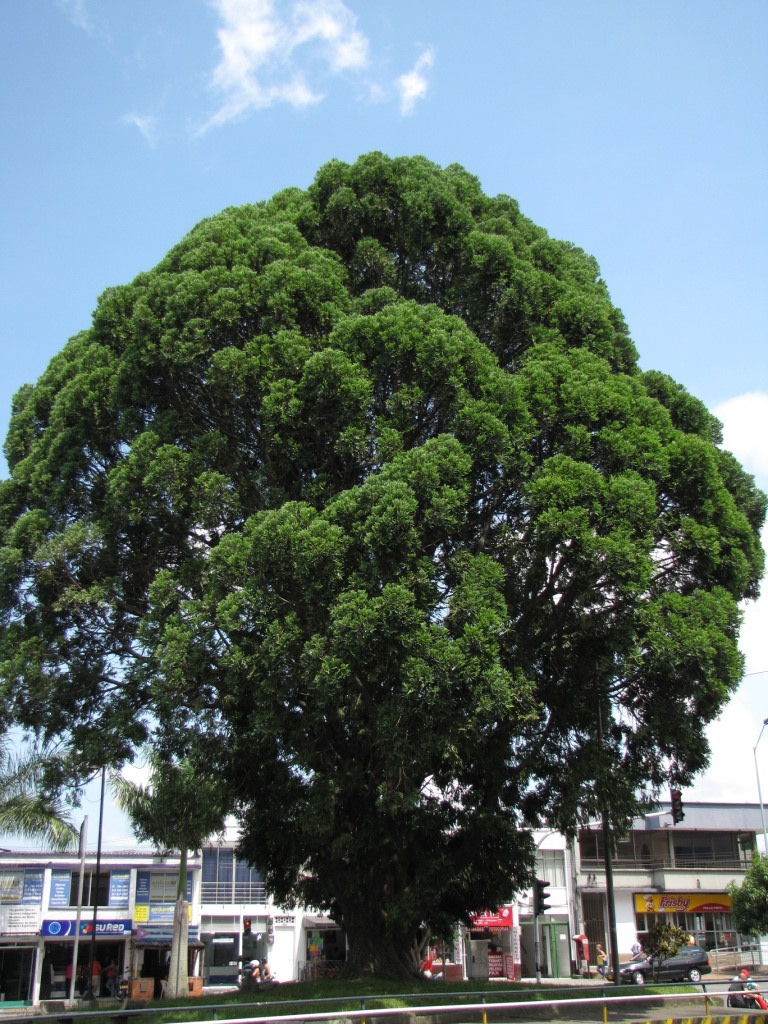

Conservation status
- Vulnerable (IUCN 3.1)

Scientific classification
- Kingdom: Plantae
- Clade: Tracheophytes
- Clade: Gymnosperms
- Division: Pinophyta
- Class: Pinopsida
- Order: Araucariales
- Family: Podocarpaceae
- Genus: Retrophyllum
- Species: R. rospigliosii

Binomial name
- Retrophyllum rospigliosii (Pilg.) C.N.Page

Synonyms
- Decussocarpus rospigliosii (Pilg.) de Laub.; Nageia rospigliosii (Pilg.) de Laub.; Podocarpus rospigliosii Pilg.; Torreya bogotensis Linden

= Retrophyllum rospigliosii =

Species of conifer

Retrophyllum rospigliosii is a species of conifer in the family Podocarpaceae. It is a large tree native to the montane rainforests of Venezuela, Colombia, Peru, Ecuador and Bolivia in South America.

== Etymology and names ==
The specific epithet rospigliosii honors C. J. Rospigliosi of the Museum of Natural History in Lima, Peru.

The species has multiple common names in the Spanish language. These include pino hayuelo, pino laso, pino de montana, pino romeron and romerillo macho.

== Description ==
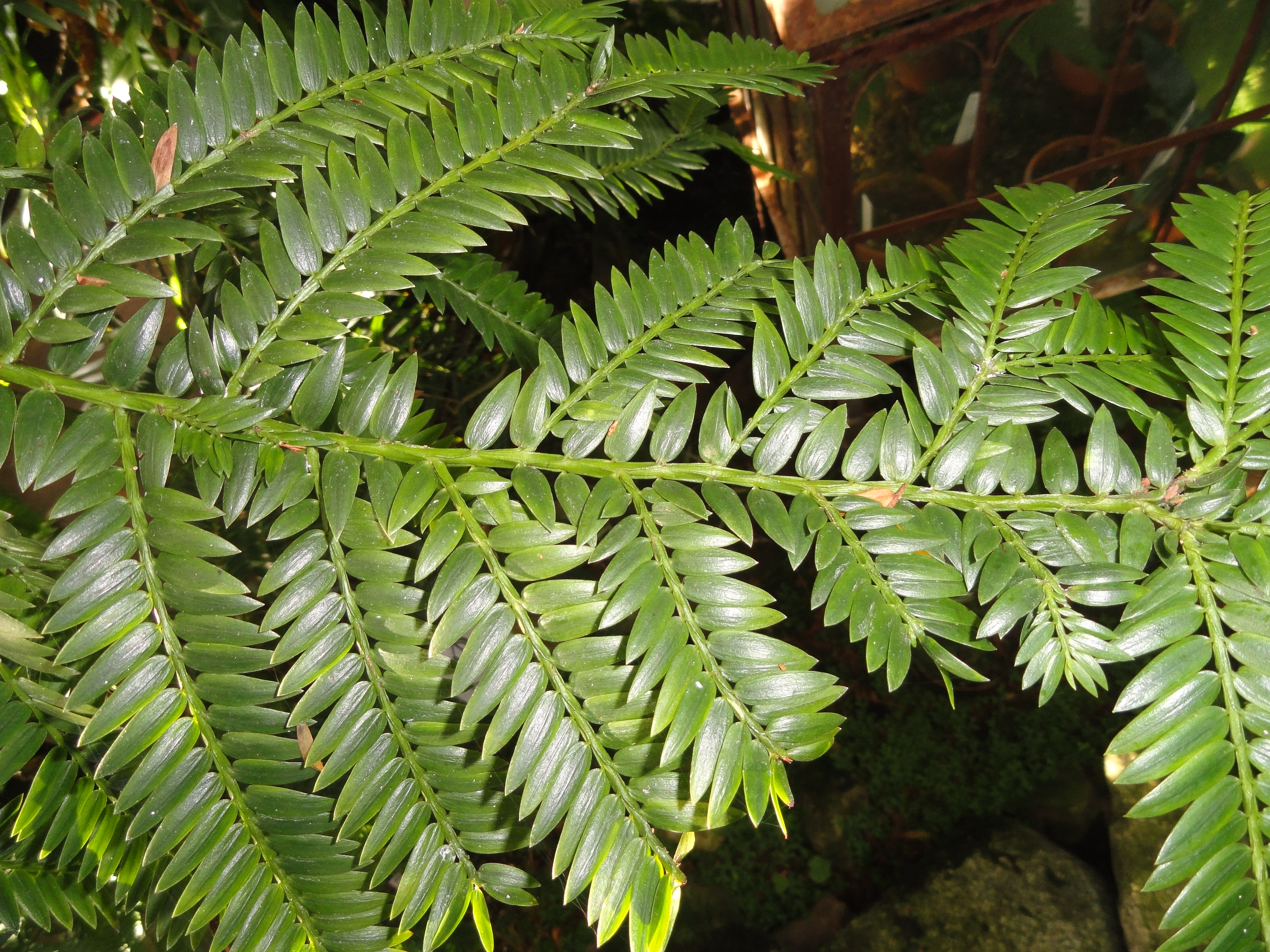
Leaves showing the pectinate arrangement.

Retrophyllum rospigliosii is a tree growing up to 45 meters in height and 1.8 meters in trunk diameter. The trunk is usually erect and straight. The crown typically becomes rounded or oval in shape as the tree matures. Branches are generally ascending or spreading, but become pendulous on shaded parts of the crown. The bark is initially brown and weathers dark gray, exfoliating in scale-like flakes.

The leaves are generally flattened with a decurrent base and a spreading blade, but leading shoots may also have appressed scale-like leaves. The leaves are inserted spirally but are twisted on lateral branchlets to appear pectinate and nearly opposite. The pectinate leaves are twisted at their petioles in opposite directions on each side of the shoot causing the adaxial sides of the leaves face up on one side of the shoot and down on the other side. The leaf blades are most commonly 10-18 millimeters long and 3-5 millimeters wide. They are ovate-lanceolate or ovate-elliptic in shape with visible midribs and entire margins. Stomata can be found on both surfaces of the leaf.

The species is dioecious. The male pollen cones are 5-7 millimeters long with spirally arranged triangular sporophylls. The female seed cones each have a single subterminal fertile cone scale with a single ovule developing into a seed. The seed is covered by a fleshy epimatium. The initially green or glaucous epimatium becomes red at maturity and varies from subglobose to ovoid-pyriform in shape with a length of 18-25 millimeters.

== Distribution ==
Retrophyllum rospigliosii is native to Bolivia, Colombia, Ecuador, Peru and Venezuela.

== Habitat and ecology ==
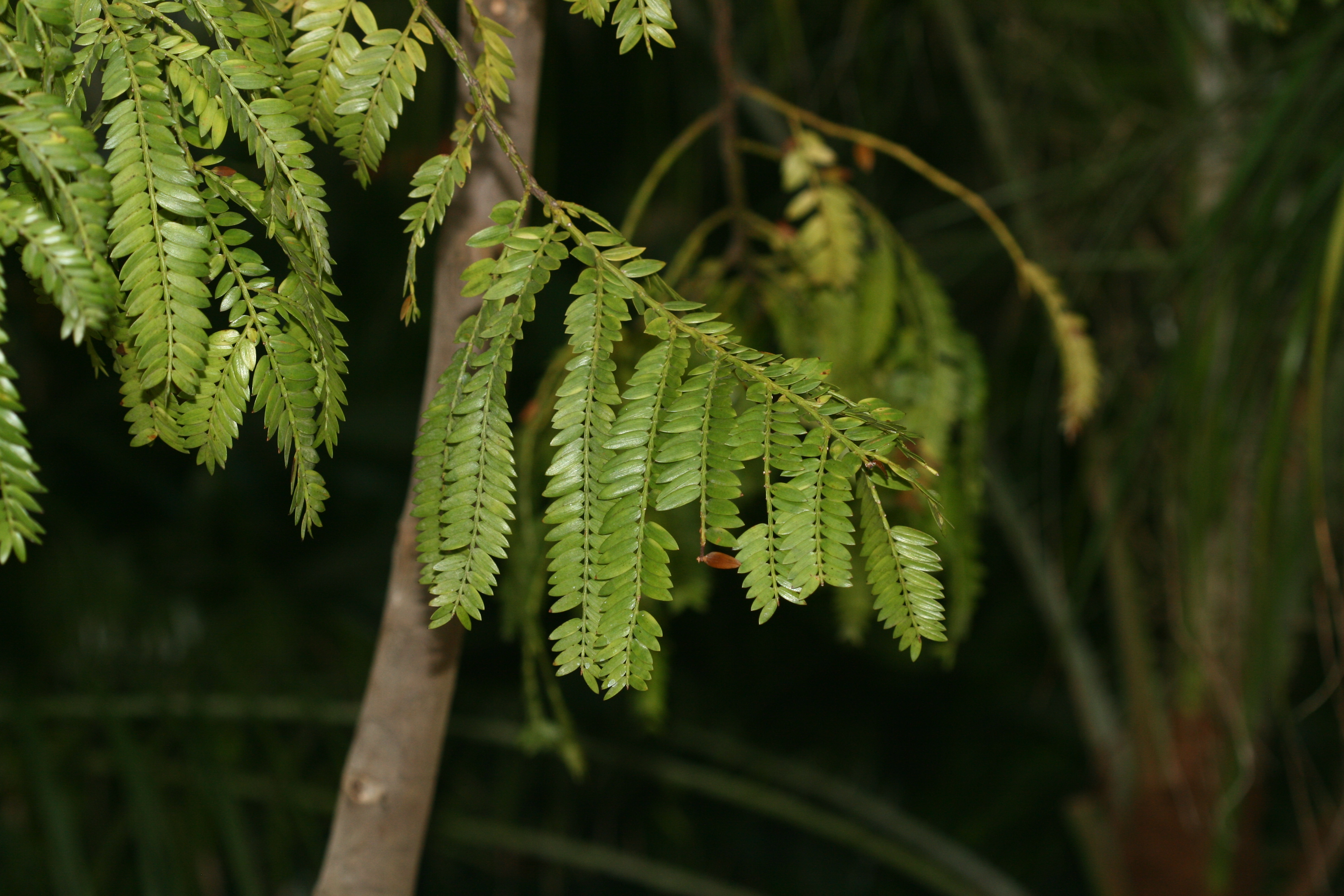
Pendulous branchlets.

Retrophyllum rospigliosii is a large rainforest tree. It occurs in montane tropical rainforests and cloud forests at elevations between 1500 and 3750 meters above the sea level. Most commonly the species grows scattered among other trees, most of which are angiosperms, but on certain sites it may also form pure stands.
