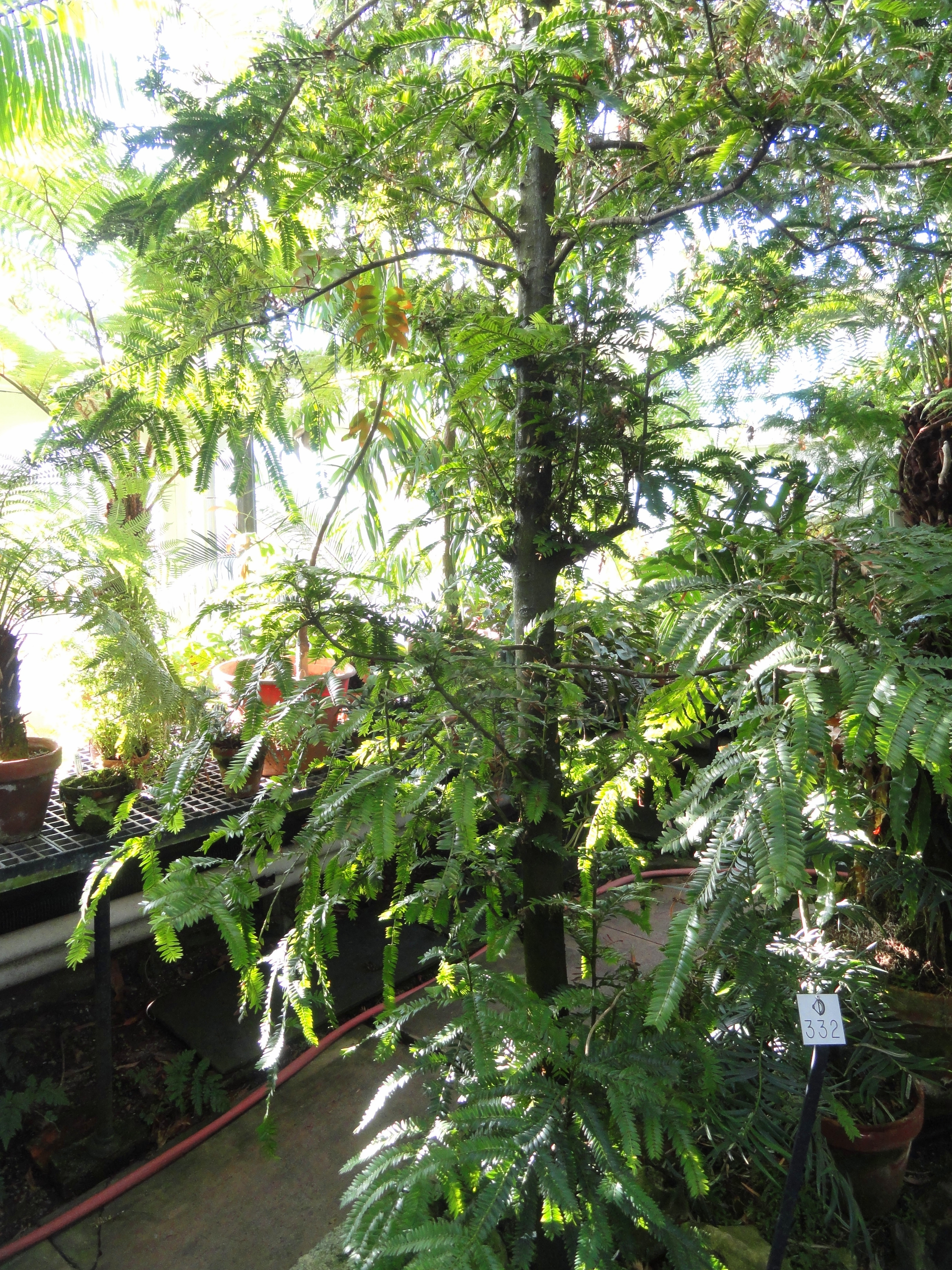
- Retrophyllum rospigliosii

Scientific classification
- Kingdom: Plantae
- Clade: Tracheophytes
- Clade: Gymnosperms
- Division: Pinophyta
- Class: Pinopsida
- Order: Araucariales
- Family: Podocarpaceae
- Genus: Retrophyllum; C.N.Page

Type species
- Retrophyllum vitiense (B.C. Seemann) C.N.Page

Species
- See text

Synonyms
- Decussocarpus de Laub.

= Retrophyllum =

Genus of conifers

Retrophyllum is a genus of conifers in the family Podocarpaceae. It contains five generally recognized extant species with a disjunct distribution in the Southern Hemisphere, found in Papuasia and also in South America. Retrophyllum are trees and shrubs typically occurring in tropical rainforests and cloud forests.

== Etymology ==
The name Retrophyllum is derived from the Latin retro, meaning "backward" or "reversed", and the Greek phyllos, meaning "leaf". The name refers to the unique phyllotaxis where the adaxial surfaces of the leaves face up on one side of the shoot and down on the other.

== Description ==
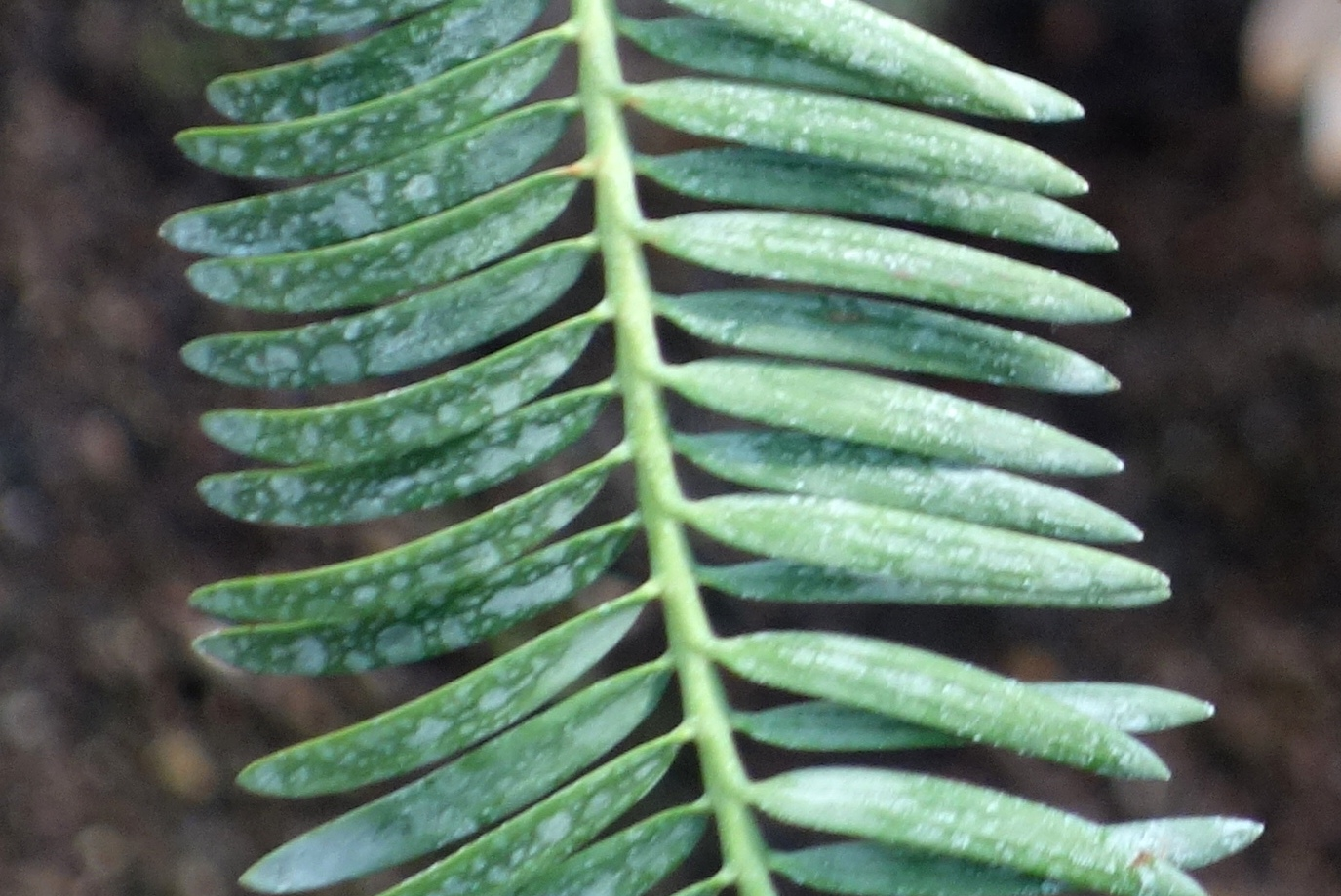
Leaves of R. minus showing the phyllotaxis. The leaves have their ventral sides up on the left and dorsal sides up on the right.

Retrophyllum are coniferous trees. They range in size from shrubby to very large, reaching heights in excess of 40 and potentially 60 meters. Resin canals are found in both leaves and the seed cones. The bark is usually smooth at first, becoming fissured or flaking with age.

The leaves are generally flat with a decurrent base and a spreading blade, but leading and cone-bearing shoots may also have small appressed scale-like leaves. The base phyllotaxis or leaf arrangement is spiral though the leaves usually form subopposite and nearly decussate pairs. The leaves of a lateral shoot are further twisted at their petioles to form two pectinate rows in a horizontal plane around the shoot. The leaf petioles in Retrophyllum are uniquely twisted on the lateral shoots in opposite directions on each side of a shoot orienting the leaf blades with the adaxial or ventral surface upwards on one side of the shoot and the abaxial or dorsal surface upwards on the opposite side of the shoot. The leaf blade varies in shape from lanceolate to narrowly ovate. The leaves have conspicuous midribs and are amphistomatic with stomata present on both sides.

Retrophyllum are dioecious with male pollen cones and female seed cones on separate individual trees. The male pollen cones may be axillary or terminal and solitary or grouped. They have glabrous peduncles. A pollen cone consists of many spirally arranged microsporophylls each with two pollen sacs producing bisaccate pollen.

The female seed cones develop from axillary buds. They are often solitary but may also be paired. The cones consist of several basal sterile cone scales and a single apical fertile scale. The basal scales are fused. The fertile scale has one seed producing ovule. The single seed of the cone is covered by a modified ovuliferous scale known as the epimatium. The epimatium becomes fleshy and drupe-like at maturity. It varies in shape from elliptic to ovoid or pyriform and may be red, violet or purplish brown in color.

== Distribution ==
Retrophyllum has a naturally disjunct distribution covering the Maluku Islands of Indonesia, New Guinea, New Britain and New Ireland in the Asia-Pacific region, Fiji, New Caledonia and Vanuatu in the Pacific and parts of Brazil, Colombia, Ecuador, Peru and Venezuela in South America. The species Retrophyllum minus occurs in riparian and lacustrine habitats on ultramafic soils in New Caledonia. The other species usually grow in tropical lowland or montane rainforests or cloud forests.

== Fossil record ==
Retrophyllum shoots have a distinctive morphology in which the leaves are in subopposite pairs, and twisted in such a way that the abaxial surface of one leaf is up, and in the other it is down. This feature, added to a distinctive epidermal morphology means that well-preserved specimens can be easily identified in the fossil record. The fossil record shows that Retrophyllum was present in the Cenozoic of Argentina, Australia and New Zealand. It is now extinct in those places.

== Taxonomy ==
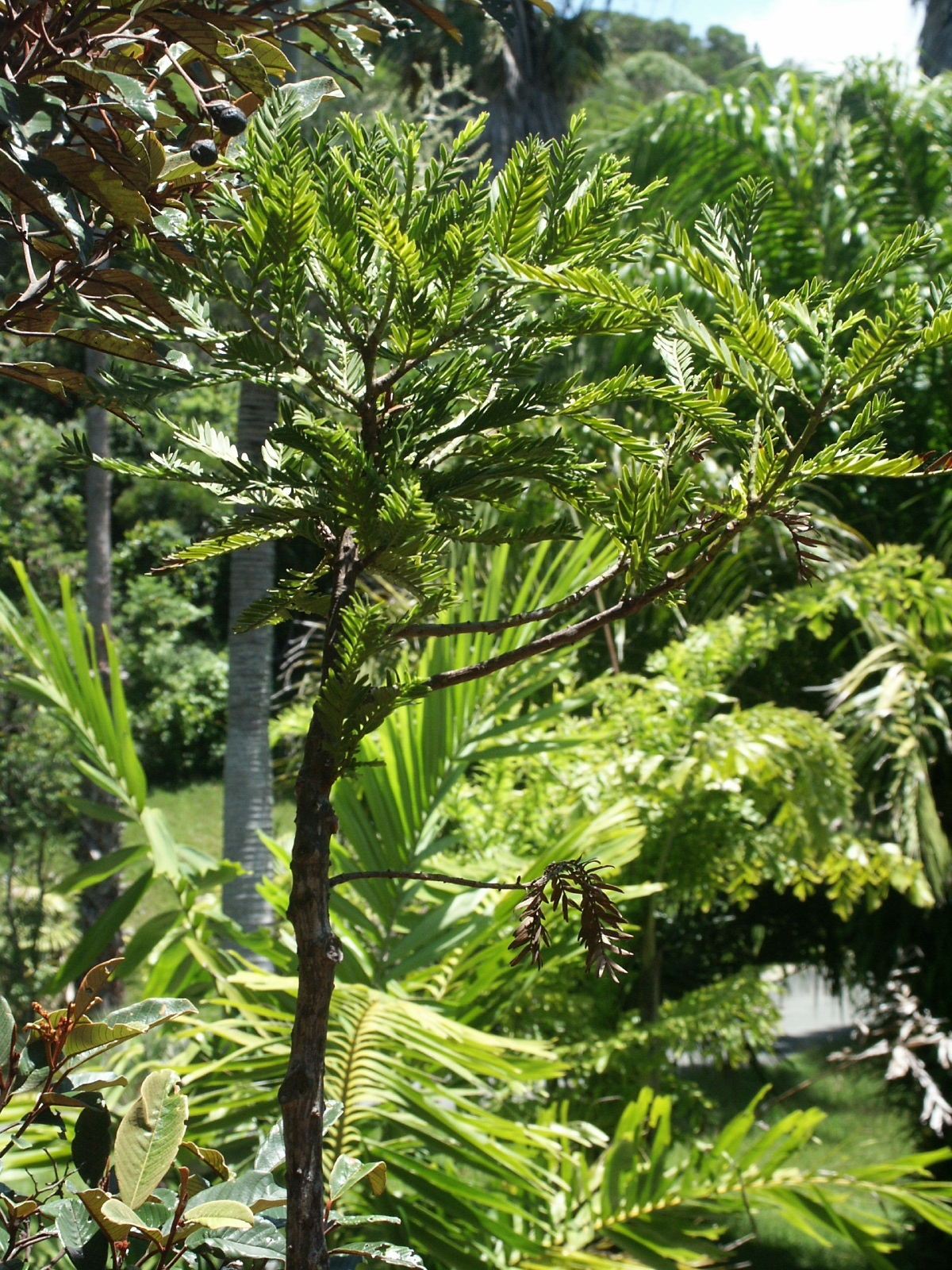
R. comptonii is native to New Caledonia.

Phylogeny of Retrophyllum

- - - R. piresii (Silba) Page
    - R. rospigliosii (Pilger) Page
  - - R. vitiense (Seemann) Page
    - - R. comptonii (Buchholz) Page
      - R. minus (Carrière) Page (Bois bouchon)

In a 2009 book on conifers, Retrophyllum piresii was treated as conspecific with Retrophyllum rospigliosii. The author stated "One specimen from low elevations in Brazil was separated as a distinct species, but it falls well within the range of variation of the species as a whole and is geographically close to some locations in Peru."

=== Species ===
There are five generally recognized species.

Image	Scientific name	Distribution
	Retrophyllum comptonii (J.Buchholz) C.N.Page	New Caledonia
	Retrophyllum minus (Carrière) C.N.Page	Plaine des Lacs in New Caledonia
	Retrophyllum piresii (Silba) C.N.Page	Serra dos Pacaás Novos in Rondônia State in W Brazil.
	Retrophyllum rospigliosii (Pilg.) C.N.Page	Colombia, Venezuela, Peru, Ecuador, Brazil.
	Retrophyllum vitiense (Seem.) C.N.Page	Maluku, New Guinea, Fiji, Bismarck Archipelago, Santa Cruz Islands.
