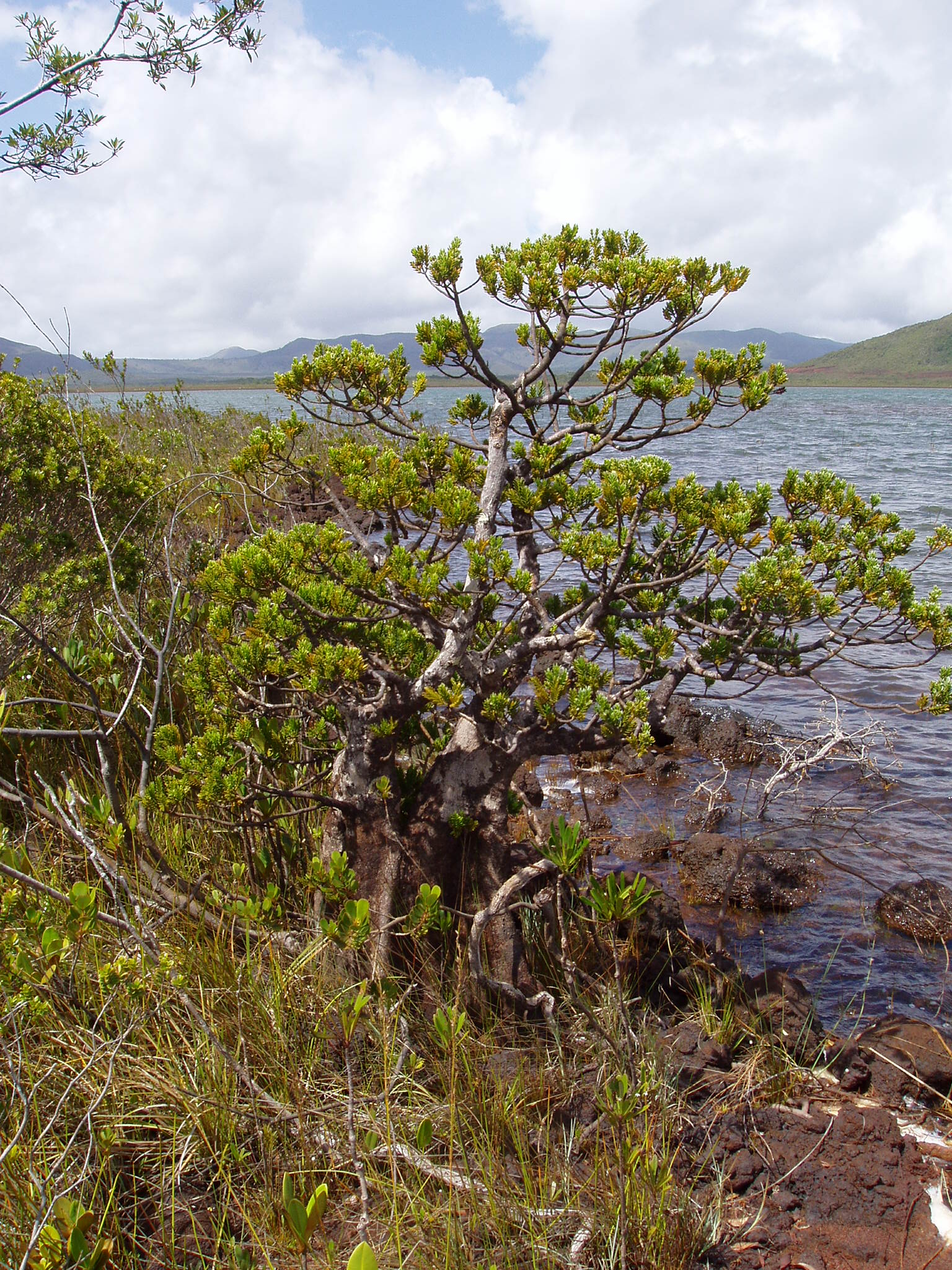

Conservation status
- Endangered (IUCN 3.1)

Scientific classification
- Kingdom: Plantae
- Clade: Tracheophytes
- Clade: Gymnosperms
- Division: Pinophyta
- Class: Pinopsida
- Order: Araucariales
- Family: Podocarpaceae
- Genus: Retrophyllum
- Species: R. minus

Binomial name
- Retrophyllum minus (Carrière) C.N.Page
- Retrophyllum minus is native to New Caledonia

Synonyms
- Decussocarpus minus (Carrière) de Laub.; Nageia minor Carrière; Podocarpus minus (Carrière) Parl.; Podocarpus palustris J.Buchholz

= Retrophyllum minus =

Species of conifer

Retrophyllum minus, the bois bouchon, is a species of conifer in the family Podocarpaceae. It is a shrub or small tree endemic to New Caledonia.

== Description ==
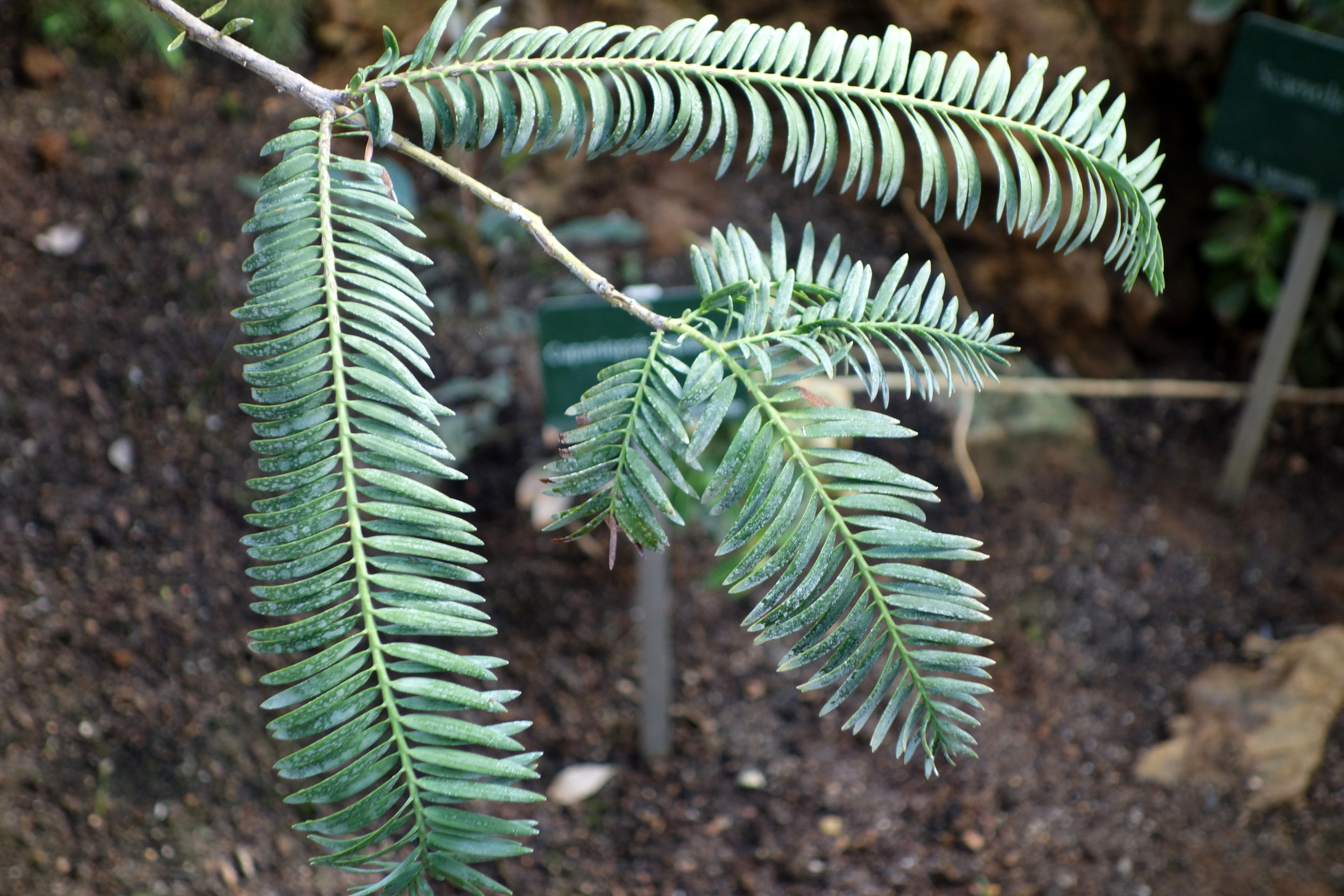
Juvenile foliage.

It is a sparsely branched small tree rarely exceeding 3 metres (10 ft) in height with a flared trunk, reminiscent of Taxodium distichum and Nyssa aquatica, which tapers towards the top and has rough bark. It produces pear-shaped berry-like cones that are dark red when mature.

== Habitat ==
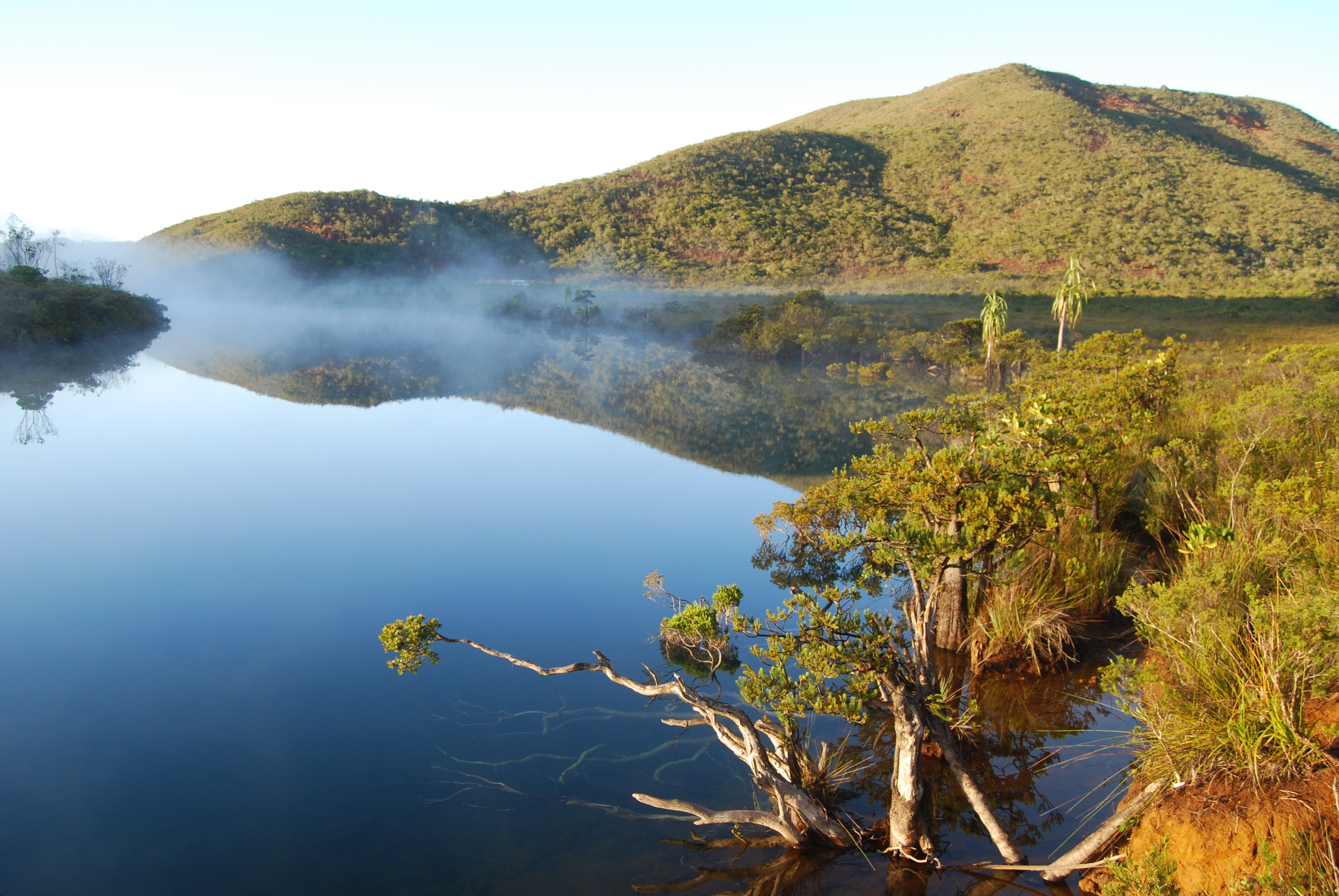
Retrophyllum minus in its natural habitat

The species occurs near rivers and lakes of the Plaine des Lakes in the south of Grande Terre. It is a rheophyte (grows in running water), the only such conifer known.

== Conservation ==
The species is threatened by habitat loss to mining and wildfire, and the IUCN Red List assesses it as Endangered. It is a protected species.
