= Retrophyllum vitiense =

Conservation status
- Least Concern (IUCN 3.1)

Scientific classification
- Kingdom: Plantae
- Clade: Tracheophytes
- Clade: Gymnosperms
- Division: Pinophyta
- Class: Pinopsida
- Order: Araucariales
- Family: Podocarpaceae
- Genus: Retrophyllum
- Species: R. vitiense

Binomial name
- Retrophyllum vitiense (Seem.) C.N.Page (1988 publ. 1989)

Synonyms
- Decussocarpus vitiensis (Seem.) de Laub. (1969); Nageia vitiensis (Seem.) Kuntze (1891); Podocarpus vitiensis Seem. (1862)

Species of conifer

Retrophyllum vitiense is a species of conifer in the family Podocarpaceae. It is a large rainforest emergent tree native to Fiji, Vanuatu, and the Santa Cruz Islands.

== Description ==
Retrophyllum vitiense is a large coniferous tree. The trunk is usually erect, straight and terete. Large trees frequently feature a bole clear of branches for the first 20 meters and a buttressed trunk base. The crown of a young plant is often pyramidal while older trees generally have rounded or spreading crowns. Branches are ascending or spreading in the upper parts of the crown, but pendulous in the shaded parts. The initially brown and smooth bark weathers gray and develops vertical fissures with age, flaking in strips.

The leaves are mostly flat with a decurrent base and a spreading blade connected by a short twisting petiole, but leading and cone-bearing shoots also have smaller scale-like leaves. The phyllotaxis is spiral though the leaves of the lateral shoots are twisted to lie pectinately in two ranks and appear nearly opposite. The pectinate leaves are twisted at their petioles in opposite directions on each side of the shoot causing the adaxial sides of the leaves face up on one side of the shoot and down on the other side. The leaf blades are usually 15-25 millimeters long, 3-5 millimeters wide and ovate-lanceolate or ovate-elliptic in shape. Juvenile leaves are often larger. The narrow midrib of the leaf is conspicuous on the abaxial side. Stomata are present on both sides of the leaf.

Retrophyllum vitiense is dioecious. The cylindrical male pollen cones are borne apically on short lateral or subterminal branchlets. They grow in groups of two or three. A pollen cone consists of numerous spirally arranged microsporophylls around a 10-25 millimeter long rachis. The microsporophylls are triangular and keeled, bearing two pollen sacs each.

The female seed cones are borne on short lateral branchlets. A seed cone has several sterile cone scales and usually just one fertile scale. The fertile cone scale has a single inverted ovule developing into a seed. The seed is entirely enclosed by a modified ovuliferous scale known as the epimatium. The epimatium is green or glaucous at first and becomes fleshy and red in color at maturity. The mature epimatium is generally 14-20 millimeters long, 10-13 millimeters wide and pyriform in shape. The subglobose seed inside is 12-16 millimeters long.

== Distribution ==
Retrophyllum vitiense is native to Fiji and the Santa Cruz Islands of the Solomon Islands.

== Habitat and ecology ==
Retrophyllum vitiense is a large rainforest tree. It grows in tropical lowland and montane rainforests ranging in altitude from near the sea level to 1800 meters. The mean annual precipitation of its natural habitat is 3290 millimeters. The species usually occurs as an emergent tree growing above the canopy in forests dominated by other trees. It commonly occurs together with other tropical conifers such as trees of the genera Podocarpus, Dacrycarpus, Dacrydium and Agathis.
