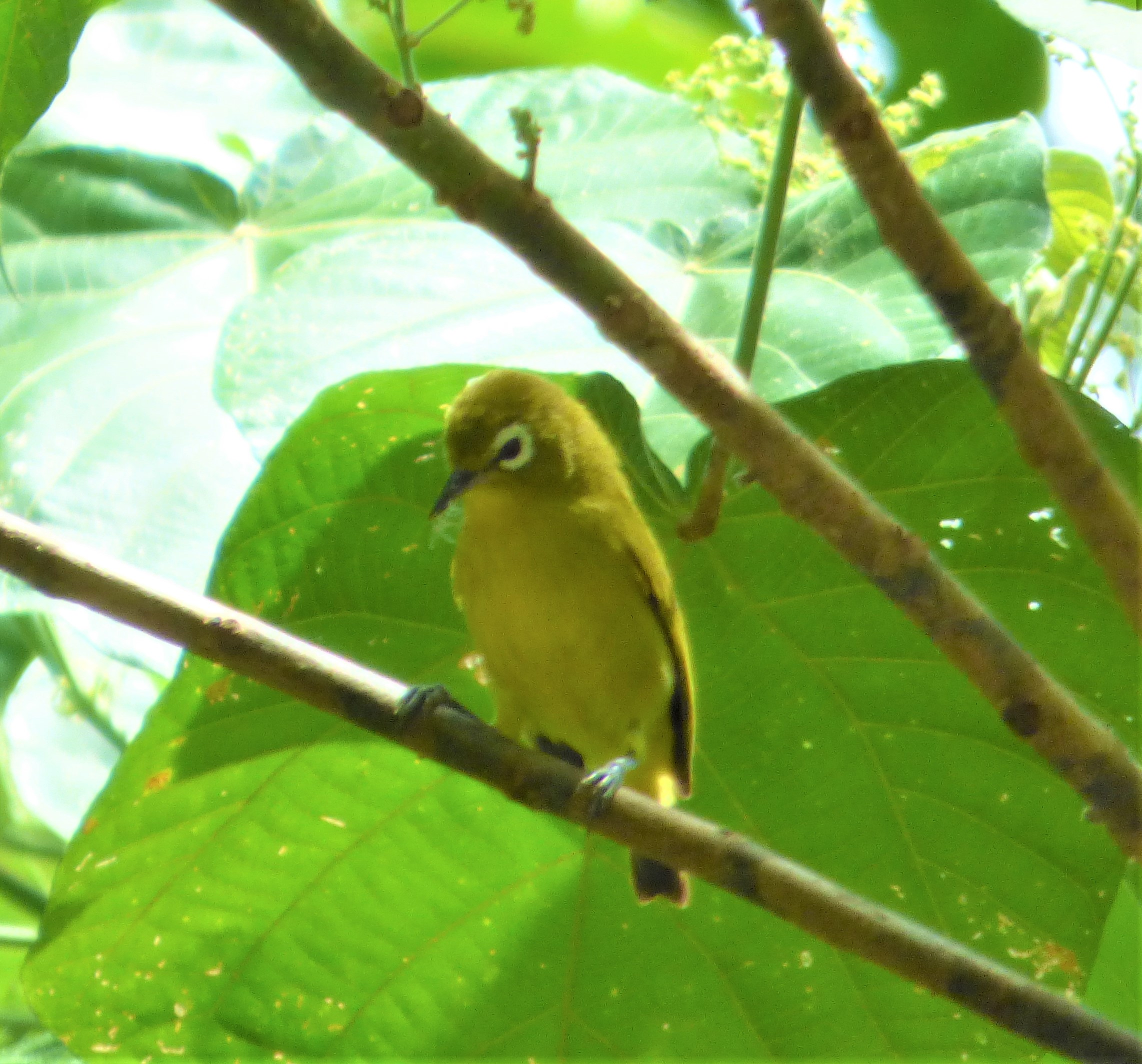
- Vanuatu white-eye on Aore Island, Vanuatu

Conservation status
- Least Concern (IUCN 3.1)

Scientific classification
- Kingdom: Animalia
- Phylum: Chordata
- Class: Aves
- Order: Passeriformes
- Family: Zosteropidae
- Genus: Zosterops
- Species: Z. flavifrons

Binomial name
- Zosterops flavifrons (Gmelin, JF, 1789)

= Vanuatu white-eye =

Species of bird

The Vanuatu white-eye or yellow-fronted white-eye (Zosterops flavifrons) is a small passerine bird belonging to the genus Zosterops in the white-eye family Zosteropidae. It is endemic to Vanuatu, where it is one of the most common birds.

== Taxonomy ==
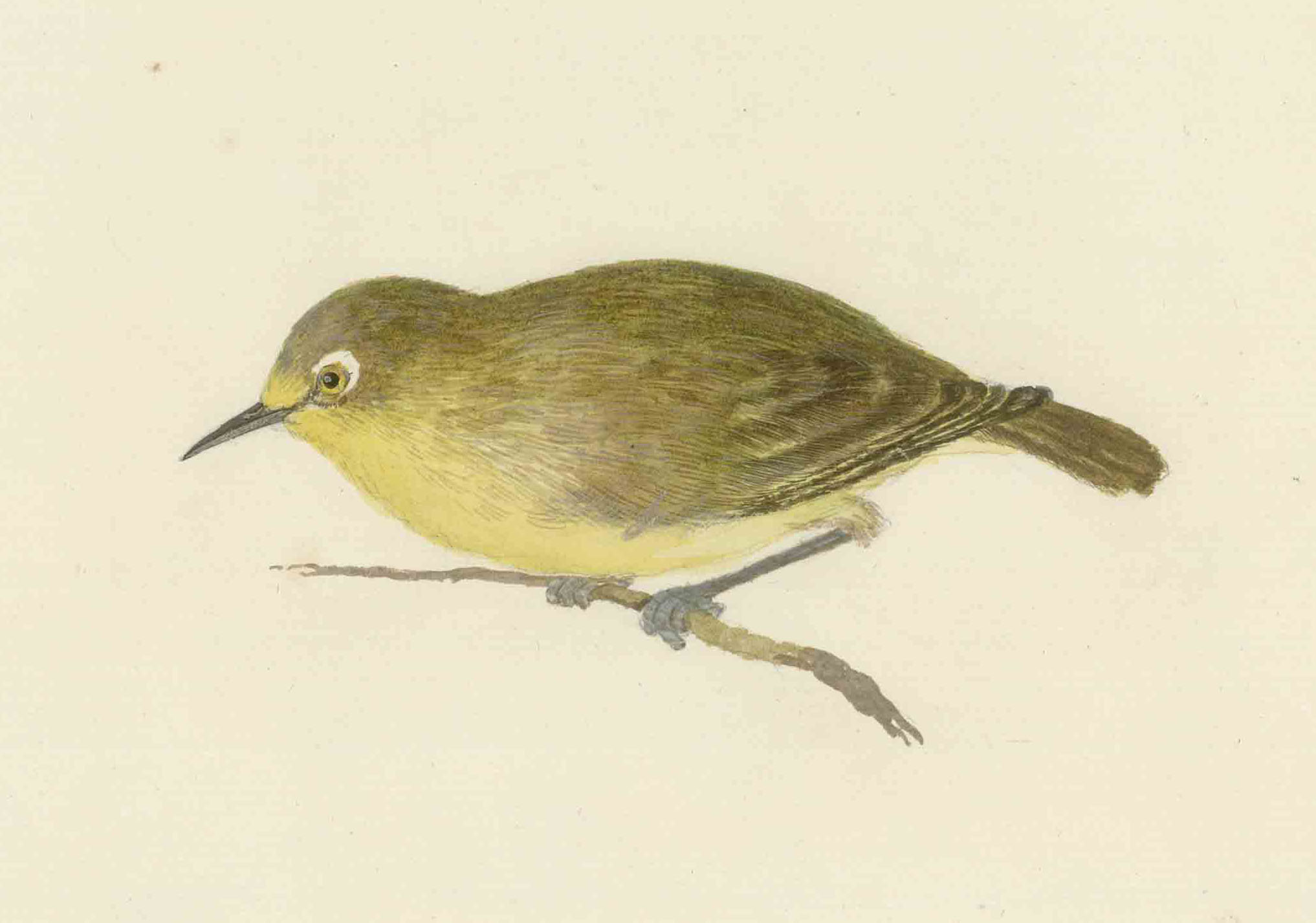
Watercolour by Georg Forster made on James Cook's second voyage to the Pacific Ocean. This painting is the holotype for the species.

The Vanuatu white-eye was formally described in 1789 by the German naturalist Johann Friedrich Gmelin in his revised and expanded edition of Carl Linnaeus's Systema Naturae. He placed it with the flycatchers in the genus Muscicapa and coined the binomial name Muscicapa flavifrons. The specific epithet combines the Latin flavus meaning "yellow" with frons meaning "forehead" or "front". Gmelin based his account on the "Yellow-fronted flycatcher" from the island of Tanna in the Vanuatu archipelago that had been described in 1783 by the English ornithologist John Latham in his book A General Synopsis of Birds. The naturalist Joseph Banks had provided Latham with a water-colour drawing of the bird by the naturalist Georg Forster who had accompanied James Cook on his second voyage to the Pacific Ocean. The picture is dated 7 August 1774. It is the holotype for the species and is now in the collection of the Natural History Museum in London. The Vanuatu white-eye is now placed with over a hundred other white-eye species in the genus Zosterops that was introduced in 1827 by Nicholas Vigors and Thomas Horsfield.

Seven subspecies are recognised:

- Z. f. gauensis Murphy & Mathews, 1929 – Gaua (north Vanuatu)
- Z. f. perplexus Murphy & Mathews, 1929 – Vanua Lava south to Epi and satellites (north, central north Vanuatu)
- Z. f. brevicauda Murphy & Mathews, 1929 – Malo and Espiritu Santo (northwest Vanuatu)
- Z. f. macgillivrayi Sharpe, 1900 – Malakula (central north Vanuatu)
- Z. f. efatensis Mayr, 1937 – Efate and Erromango (central south Vanuatu])
- Z. f. flavifrons (Gmelin, JF, 1789) – Tanna and Aniwa (south Vanuatu)
- Z. f. majusculus Murphy & Mathews, 1929 – Anatom Island (=Aneityum, south Vanuatu)

== Description ==
The Vanuatu white-eye is 11–12 cm (4.3–4.7 in) in overall length. The adult male is yellow-green above while the underparts are bright yellow or yellow-green depending on the subspecies. The forehead is yellow and there is a white ring around the eye. The legs and feet are dark grey and the bill is brown above and pinkish below. Female and immature birds are similar to the male but paler. The immatures also have a narrower eye-ring.

The contact call is short and high-pitched. The song is a repeated warbling.

== Distribution and habitat ==
The seven subspecies are distributed almost throughout Vanuatu from the Banks Islands in the north to Aneityum in the south. The species occurs in a variety of habitats including forest, plantations and gardens from sea level to the mountains.

== Behaviour ==
The neat, cup-shaped nest is built 2.5 m (8 ft 2 in) or more above the ground and is made of grass, pieces of bark and spider webs. The eggs are bluish-white and there are three in a clutch.

It forages in bushes and trees, moving around in pairs or small flocks. The varied diet includes insects, nectar and fruit such as lantana berries and wild figs.
