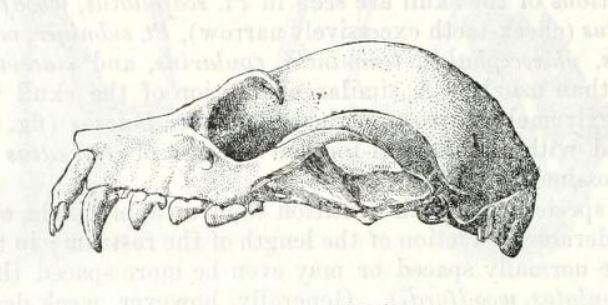

Conservation status
- Vulnerable (IUCN 3.1)

Scientific classification
- Kingdom: Animalia
- Phylum: Chordata
- Class: Mammalia
- Order: Chiroptera
- Family: Pteropodidae
- Genus: Pteropus
- Species: P. anetianus

Binomial name
- Pteropus anetianus Gray, 1870
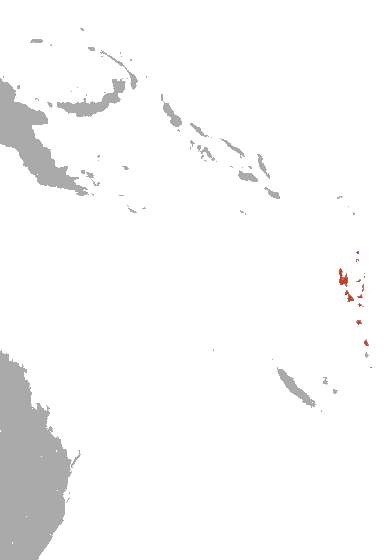
- Vanuatu flying fox range

= Vanuatu flying fox =

Species of bat

The Vanuatu flying fox or white flying fox (Pteropus anetianus) is a species of flying fox in the family Pteropodidae. It is endemic to Vanuatu. It is most closely related to the Samoa flying fox.
