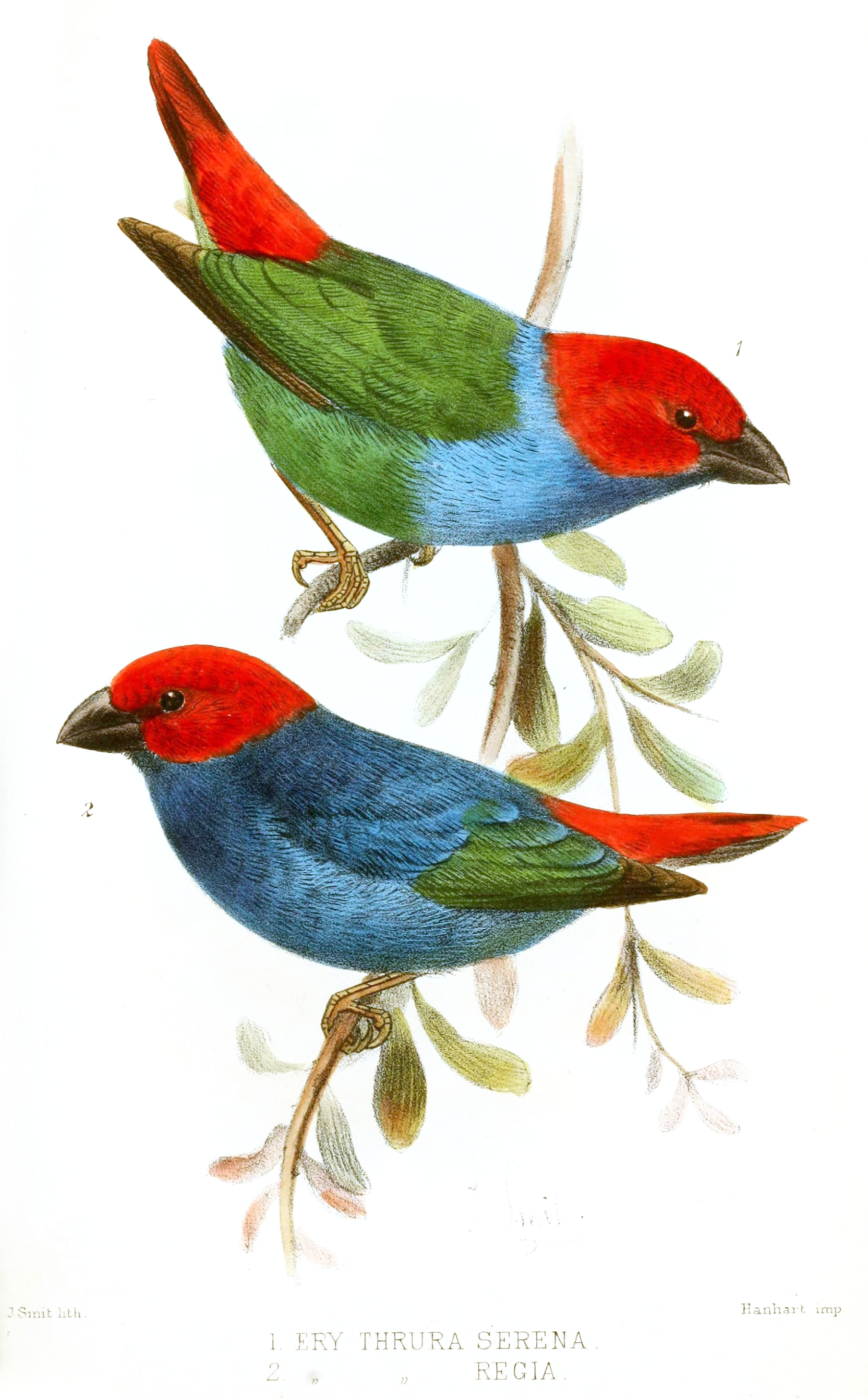
- Illustration (below) with Erythrura cyaneovirens

Scientific classification
- Kingdom: Animalia
- Phylum: Chordata
- Class: Aves
- Order: Passeriformes
- Family: Estrildidae
- Genus: Erythrura
- Species: E. regia

Binomial name
- Erythrura regia (Sclater, PL, 1881)

= Royal parrotfinch =

Species of bird

The royal parrotfinch (Erythrura regia) is a species of estrildid finch endemic to Vanuatu in the South Pacific Ocean. It is found commonly at mid-altitudes on the larger islands such as Espiritu Santo, above 300 m., but it also can be found at small sea-level islands in fruiting figs in forest edge in Emae and Tongoa. This species is usually found in singles, pairs or small groups feeding on figs in the forest canopy.

== Taxonomy ==
Taxonomists disagree on whether the royal parrotfinch is a standalone species or a subspecies of red-headed parrotfinch (Erythrura cyaneovirens). As of 2026, the HBW/IUCN, Clements, and AviList taxonomies consider it a subspecies, E. c. regia. IOC taxonomy retains it as a separate species.

== Identification ==
The royal parrotfinch is approximately 11 cm long. This species is a multicoloured finch. Male royal parrotfinches have a bright red head and tail, blue breast and turquoise-green upperparts, while females are greener in colour. Young royal parrotfinches are duller with a dull blue head. This species has a high, thin voice and trilling song.

== Threats ==
This species is threatened by commercial logging which has removed its natural habitat. There are also reports of small-scale cage-bird trade of royal parrotfinches.

== Conservation measures ==
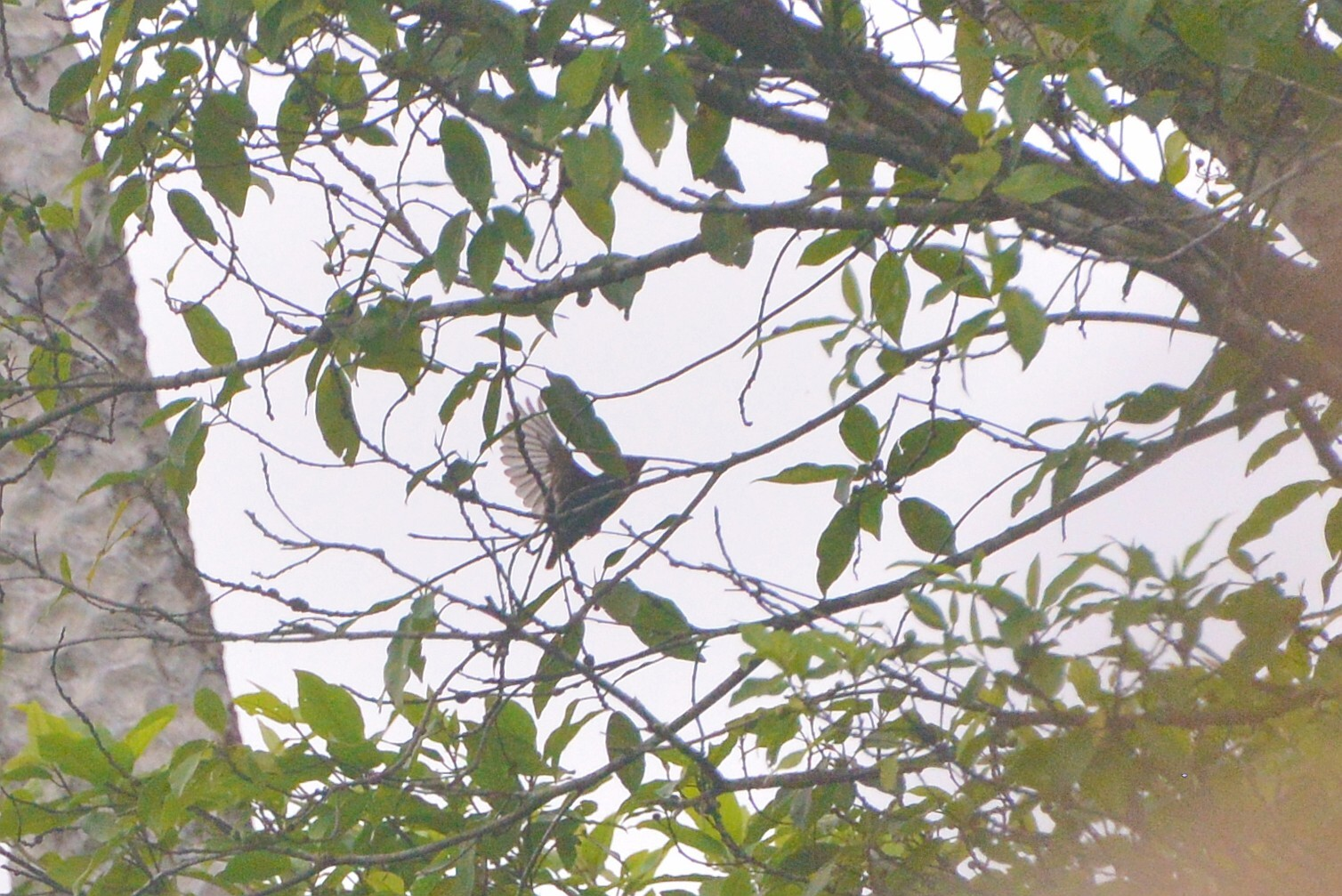
Live bird flying

It was suggested to implement a captive conservation breeding programme on Lake Letas Reserve, Gaua. It was also proposed to investigate any cage-bird trade, especially on Tongoa and Emae. The suggestion was to reduce commercial logging to conserve forest reserves, supporting the natural habitat of Lake Letas Reserve.
