= Repatriation of indentured Indians from Fiji =

Repatriation

Between 1879 and 1916, tens of thousands of Indians moved to Fiji to work as indentured labourers, especially on sugarcane plantations. Repatriation of indentured Indians from Fiji began on 3 May 1892, when the British Peer brought 464 repatriated Indians to Calcutta. Various ships made similar journeys to Calcutta and Madras, concluding with Sirsa's 1951 voyage. In 1955 and 1956, three ships brought Indian labourers from Fiji to Sydney, from where the labourers flew to Bombay.

== Conditions of return ==
Indentured Indians wishing to return to India were given two options. One was travel at their own expense and the other free of charge but subject to certain conditions. To obtain free passage back to India, labourers had to have been above age twelve upon arrival, completed at least five years of service and lived in Fiji for a total of ten consecutive years. A child born to these labourers in Fiji could accompany his or her parents or guardian back to India if he or she was under twelve.

Due to the high cost of returning at their own expense, most indentured immigrants returning to India left Fiji around ten to twelve years after arrival. Indeed, just over twelve years passed between the voyage of the first ship carrying indentured Indians to Fiji (the Leonidas, in 1879) and the first ship to take Indians back (the British Peer, in 1892).

== Repatriation ==
Given the steady influx of ships carrying indentured Indians to Fiji up until 1916, repatriated Indians generally boarded these same ships on their return voyage. The total number of repatriates under the Fiji indenture system is recorded as 39,261, while the number of arrivals is said to have been 60,553. Because the return figure includes children born in Fiji, many of the indentured Indians never returned to India.

Direct return voyages by ship ceased after 1951. Instead, arrangements were made for flights from Sydney to Bombay, the first of which departed in July 1955. Labourers still travelled to Sydney by ship.

== List of ship charters to India ==
Name of ship	Date of departure	Calcutta arrivals	Madras arrivals	Total arrivals
British Peer	3 May 1892	464 (260m 111w 35b 43g 15i)		464
Hereford	25 June 1892	24		24
Moy	28 April 1893	529 (317m 133f 34b 31g 17i)		529
Ems	5 May 1894	576 (312m 148f 38b 42g 36i)		576
Hereford	16 July 1894	447 (277m 125f 41b 28g 21i)		447
SS Virawa	14 May 1895	608 (347m 147f 38b 40g 36i)		608
Erne	14 May 1896	675 (371m 170f 55b 50g 29i)		675
Moy	15 June 1898	393 (273m 65f 25b 19g 13i)		393
Avon	10 August 1899	328 (213m 66f 20b 15g 14i)		328
Ganges	12 September 1899	33 (24m 5f 2b 2g)		33
Elbe	23 July 1900	405 (245m 87f 28b 31g 14i)		405
SS Fazilka	2 July 1901	515 (298m 107f 45b 44g 33i)		515
SS Fazilka	5 July 1902	479 (291m 90f 44b 41g 13i)		479
Arno	15 September 1903	549 (325m 114f 63b 52g 25i)		549
Arno	19 August 1904	366 (211m 91f 34b 37g 20i)		366
SS Virawa	26 July 1905	341 (193m 64w 31b 36g 17i)		341
SS Fazilka	1 May 1906	321 (221m 71f 13b 12g 4i)		321
SS Fazilka	10 February 1907	533 (316m 96w 56b 42g 23i)	63 (34m 21f 4b 1g 3i)	596
SS Fazilka	1 May 1907	26 (15m 8f 2g 1i)	21 (14m 6f 1g)	47
SS Sangola	30 March 1908	606 (363m 115f 42b 60g 26i)	87 (51m 24f 6b 3g 3i)	693
SS Sangola	11 February 1909	60	54 (30m 15f 1b 3g 5i)	114
SS Sangola	16 March 1910	351 (245m 63f 18b 14g 8i)	20 (12m 6f 1b 1g)	371
SS Santhia	30 April 1910	18 (14m 4f)	23 (13m 5f 1b 3g 1i)	41
SS Sutlej	8 July 1911	545 (408m 78f 30b 21g 9i)	102 (66m 24f 7b 2g 3i)	647
SS Sutlej	7 October 1911	53 (34m 12f 2b 2g 3i)	8 (3m 4f 1g)	61
SS Sutlej	9 May 1912	616 (383m 108f 47b 59g 20i)	103 (54m 34f 7b 6g 2i)	719
SS Ganges	28 February 1913	681	126	807
SS Chenab	8 March 1914	675	264	801
SS Chenab	22 June 1914	321	33	354
SS Mutlah	13 May 1915	473	95	568
SS Chenab	6 September 1916	486	242	728
Ganges I	7 June 1920	844	303	1,147
Ganges II	30 August 1920	1046	82	1,128
SS Ganges	12 November 1920	892	239	1,131
SS Torilla	18 December 1920	1134	105	1,239
SS Ganges	12 February 1921	1444	149	1,593
SS Ganges	24 May 1921	1000	214	1214
SS Ganges	7 June 1920	695	241	936
SS Ganges	12 November 1920	799	166	965
SS Torilla	18 December 1920	1808	93	1,901
Ganges	12 February 1921	974	100	1,074
Ganges	24 May 1921	996	178	1,174
SS Chenab	22 November 1921	739	249	988
SS Sutlej	6 June 1922	512	454	966
SS Chenab	27 December 1922	565	372	937
Ganges	6 November 1923	411	560	971
SS Sutlej	20 December 1924	558	464	1,022
Unknown	25 January 1926	701	487	1,188
SS Ganges	31 January 1927	528		528
Ganges	26 February 1927	514	582	1,096
SS Sutlej	21 April 1928	530	442	972
SS Sutlej	8 July 1929	365	286	651
SS Sutlej	16 March 1930	346	305	651
SS Ganges	7 September 1931	103	171	274
Ganges	14 May 1932	76	93	169
Ganges	30 August 1933	136	112	248
SS Ganges	22 August 1934	78	45	123
SS Elephanta	14 November 1935	82	80	162
SS Ganges	24 December 1936	105	66	171
SS Ganges	21 April 1938	109	86	195
SS Ganges	20 September 1939	56	65	121
MV Orna	3 August 1947	106	52	158
SS Selma	13 May 1945	12	7	19
MV Orna	5 March 1948	29	32	61
MV Orna	18 August 1948	70	50	120
MV Orna	8 July 1949	95	47	142
Unknown	28 March 1950	53	22	75
SS Sirsa	17 May 1951	34	12	46
			Total	39,157

Legend
m	Men
w	Women
b	Boys
g	Girls
i	Infants

== List of ship charters to Sydney ==
The following ships brought labourers to Sydney.

Name of ship	Flight departure	Number of departures
Strathmore	25 July 1955	25
Stratheden	29 November 1955	68
Strathnaver	24 July 1956	12
	Total	105

== See also ==
- Girmityas
- List of Indian indenture ships to Fiji
- Indian indenture system
