= SS Chenab =

British-built steamship that carried Indian indentured labourers

History
- Name: 1911: Chenab; 1931: Ville de Beyrouth; 1939: Al Rawdah
- Namesake: 1911: Chenab River; 1931: Beirut
- Owner: 1911: James Nourse; 1930: Cie de Nav Libano-Syrienne; 1936: Soc Orientale de Nav; 1940: Ministry of Shipping; 1941: Ministry of War Transport; 1946: Khedivial Mail Line
- Operator: 1936: Khedivial Mail Line; 1940: British India SN Co; 1941: Admiralty
- Port of registry: 1911: (United Kingdom) London; 1931: (France) Beirut; 1940: (United Kingdom) London; 1946: (Kingdom of Egypt) Alexandria
- Builder: Cammell Laird, Birkenhead
- Cost: £52,000
- Yard number: 771
- Launched: 10 June 1911
- Completed: August 1911
- Identification: UK official number 132589; until 1930: code letters HTFG; by 1918: call sign GWK; 1930: call sign GPYN; 1931: code letters OWTB; by 1934: call sign FPDO; 1940: call sign GLNG; 1946: call sign SUCI
- Fate: Scrapped in 1953

General characteristics
- Tonnage: 3,549 GRT, 2,157 NRT, 5,200 DWT
- Length: 350.2 ft (106.7 m)
- Beam: 44.2 ft (13.5 m)
- Draught: 19 ft 1/2 in (5.80 m)
- Depth: 27.6 ft (8.4 m)
- Decks: 1
- Installed power: 426 NHP
- Propulsion: 1 × triple-expansion engine; 1 × screw
- Speed: 12 knots (22 km/h)
- Notes: sister ships: Indus, Ganges, Mutlah, Sutlej

SS Chenab was a steamship that was built in England in 1911 and scrapped in Scotland in 1953. For nearly two decades she was part of Nourse Line, which carried Girmityas (indentured labourers) from India to colonies in the Caribbean and the Pacific. In 1914 she was requisitioned for service in the First World War.

In 1930 Nourse sold Chenab, and in 1931 she was renamed Ville de Beyrouth. In 1939 she was renamed Al Rawdah. In 1940 the UK Government requisitioned her for Second World War service. She was returned to her owners in 1946, and scrapped in 1953.

== Building ==
In the 1900s Charles Connell and Company of Scotstoun, Glasgow built a series of ships to the same design for James Nourse. Indus was completed in 1904, Ganges in 1906, Mutlah in 1907 and Sutlej in 1908. In 1911 Cammell, Laird & Co of Birkenhead on the River Mersey built Chenab for Nourse for £52,000 to the same general design. She was built as yard number 771; launched on 10 June that year; and completed that August.

Chenab's registered length was 350.2 ft (106.7 m), her beam was 44.2 ft (13.5 m) and her depth was 27.6 ft (8.4 m). Her tonnages were 3,549 GRT, 2,157 NRT, and 5,200 DWT. She had a single screw, driven by a three-cylinder triple-expansion engine. It was rated at 426 NHP and gave her a speed of 12 knots (22 km/h).

Nourse registered Chenab at London. Her UK official number was 132589 and her code letters were HTFG. By 1914 she was equipped for wireless telegraphy. By 1918 her call sign was GWK. In 1930 this was superseded by the four-letter call sign GPYN.

== Chenab ==
The table below lists some of the voyages Chenab made in her first five years of her career, carrying indentured Indian workers to the Caribbean and the Pacific.

Destination	Date of Arrival	Number of Passengers	Deaths During Voyage
Trinidad	7 November 1911	451	3
Trinidad	7 March 1912	350	5
Surinam	8 July 1912	n/a	n/a
British Guiana	1912	n/a	n/a
Trinidad	8 November 1912	410	5
Trinidad	13 March 1913	96	0
Suriname	7 July 1913	n/a	n/a
Fiji	24 March 1914	855	n/a
Trinidad	12 September 1914	179	0
Fiji	16 June 1914	717	
Fiji	1 September 1916	717	n/a
Trinidad	10 December 1916	627	2

On 24 August 1913, Chenab was returning from Demerara to Calcutta when she grounded off Stoney Point, South Africa. She spent the next two months in Durban being repaired.

30 September 1914 Chenab was requisitioned as a troop ship for the Indian Expeditionary Forces. She was returned to her owners that December. On 1 March 1916 she was requisitioned to carry sugar, and on 17 April she was returned to her owners. On 19 December 1916 she was requisitioned to carry wheat, and on 10 February 1917 she was returned to her owners. On 11 February 1917 she was requisitioned as a troop ship for the Indian Expeditionary Forces. She was returned to her owners on 25 May 1919.

== Ville de Beyrouth and Al Rawdah ==
In 1930 William McKnight Docharty bought Chenab for £14,000 on behalf of the Khedivial Mail S.S. Company. Her passenger accommodation was refitted. In 1931 she passed to the Compagnie de Navigation Libano-Syrienne, who renamed her Ville de Beyrouth and registered her in Beirut. Her code letters were OWTB until 1934, when the call sign FPDO superseded them.

In 1936 the Société Orientale de Navigation acquired Ville de Beyrouth and appointed Khedivial Mail to manage her. Khedivial Mail became the Pharaonic Mail Line. In 1939 the ship was renamed Al Rawdah.

In 1940 the UK Ministry of Shipping requisitioned Al Rawdah for war service and appointed the British India Steam Navigation Company to manage her. In 1941 the Ministry of War Transport superseded the Ministry of Shipping. Between July 1940 and March 1946 she was a military store ship, detention ship, and Royal Navy accommodation ship. On 26 March the UK Al Rawdah to her owners, who by then were called Khedivial Mail Line.

Metal Industries, Limited scrapped the ship at Rosyth on the Firth of Forth, starting work in May 1953.

== See also ==
- Indian indenture ships to Fiji
- Indian indenture system

== Bibliography ==
- Lloyd's Register of Shipping. Vol. I.–Steamers. London: Lloyd's Register of Shipping. 1914 – via Internet Archive.
- Lloyd's Register of Shipping (PDF). Vol. II.–Steamers and motorships of 300 tons gross and over. London: Lloyd's Register of Shipping. 1933 – via Southampton City Council.
- Lloyd's Register of Shipping (PDF). Vol. II.–Steamers and motorships of 300 tons gross and over. London: Lloyd's Register of Shipping. 1934 – via Southampton City Council.
- Lloyd's Register of Shipping (PDF). Vol. II.–Steamers and motorships of 300 tons gross and over. London: Lloyd's Register of Shipping. 1935 – via Southampton City Council.
- Lloyd's Register of Shipping (PDF). Vol. II.–Steamers and motorships of 300 tons, Trawlers, tugs, dredgers, &c, Sailing vessels, Shipowners, &c. London: Lloyd's Register of Shipping. 1939 – via Southampton City Council.
- Lloyd's Register of Shipping (PDF). Vol. I.–Steamers and motorships of 300 tons, Trawlers, tugs, dredgers, &c, Sailing vessels, Shipowners, &c. London: Lloyd's Register of Shipping. 1940 – via Southampton City Council.
- Lloyd's Register of Shipping (PDF). Vol. II.–Steamers and motorships of 300 tons gross and over. London: Lloyd's Register of Shipping. 1941 – via Southampton City Council.
- Lloyd's Register of Shipping. Vol. Steamers and motorships of 300 tons gross and over, Steamers and motorships under 300 tons, trawlers, tugs, dredgers, &c, sailing vessels, list of ship owners, &c. London: Lloyd's Register of Shipping. 1946 – via Internet Archive.
- The Marconi Press Agency Ltd (1918). The Year Book of Wireless Telegraphy and Telephony. London: The Wireless Press, Ltd.
- Mercantile Navy List. London. 1913 – via Crew List Index Project.
- Mercantile Navy List. London. 1930 – via Crew List Index Project.
