= SS Ganges (1906) =

3,475-ton steamship

History
- Name: Ganges (1906–1930); Seapro (1930–)
- Owner: Nourse Line; F. B. Saunders (1928–1929); Sea Products of London (1929–)
- Builder: Charles Connell & Company
- Yard number: 303
- Launched: 9 March 1906
- Completed: May 1906
- Fate: Scrapped 1934

General characteristics
- Type: Steam ship
- Tonnage: 3,475 GRT, 2,151 NRT, 5,200 DWT
- Installed power: Triple expansion steam, 426 hp (318 kW)
- Propulsion: Single screw
- Speed: 11.5 knots (21.3 km/h; 13.2 mph)

SS Ganges was a 3,475-ton steamship, built for the Nourse Line by Charles Connell and Company of Glasgow and launched on 9 March 1906. She made seven trips carrying Indian indentured labourers from Calcutta and Madras to Fiji, ten trips to Trinidad and Tobago and also trips to Surinam and British Guiana.

== Namesakes ==
SS Ganges was the third Nourse Line ship to be named Ganges. The first Ganges was built in 1861 and wrecked in 1881. The second Ganges was built in 1885 and sold to Norway in 1904.

== Voyages ==
Destination	Date of Arrival	Number of Passengers
Trinidad	25 October 1906	479
Trinidad	10 October 1907	344
Suriname	17 February 1908	n/a
Suriname	10 July 1908	n/a
Trinidad	20 July 1908	642
Trinidad	16 June 1909	819
Trinidad	24 November 1910	842
Trinidad	25 March 1911	776
Fiji	22 July 1911	860
Trinidad	9 December 1911	428
Suriname	7 April 1912	n/a
Fiji	18 July 1912	843
Fiji	8 November 1912	846
Fiji	21 February 1913	771
Fiji	29 May 1913	848
Fiji	9 September 1913	784
Fiji	21 June 1915	846
Trinidad	11 November 1915	325
Trinidad	18 April 1916	200
British Guiana	18 April 1917	421
Trinidad	22 April 1917	421

Having been in operation during the last years of the Indian indenture system, Ganges was the last ship to carry Indian indentured labourers to Trinidad and to British Guiana, docking in Georgetown on 18 April 1917.

== First World War ==
Between 7 and 31 August 1914 Ganges was requisitioned for use as a Royal Navy collier; and from September of the same year to the following January became an Indian Expeditionary Force transport. For periods of 1916 and 1917 she was requisitioned to transport various bulk cargoes including coal, sugar and wheat. From 6 January 1918 until 19 April 1919 she came under the Liner Requisition Scheme.

== Later history ==
Ganges was sold out of the fleet in 1928 to F. B. Saunders of London who sold her on the following year to Sea Products of London. She became Seapro in 1930 and served for a further four years before being sold for breaking to Thos. W. Ward in 1934.

== Notable passengers ==
The parents of Fiji's first Chief Justice Sir Moti Tikaram (KBE), Thakur Tikaram (born 1877) and his wife Singaribai Tikaram (born 1894) arrived in Fiji on July 10, 1912 on the SS Ganges (Emigration Pass No. 50079).

Fiji Indian businessman Sir Sathi Narain, Devara Suramma (Emigration Pass No. 52043) and Gompa Appalasamy (Emigration Pass No. 51617), arrived on this ship from India to Fiji in 1913. Abdul Wahid who ran as a Mayoral Candidate in Tracy, USA. His grandfather Ali Mohammed f/n Mehardad was one of the indentured labor who came at the age of 20.

== See also ==
- Indian Indenture Ships to Fiji
- Indian indenture system
