= Main (1884 ship) =

History

United Kingdom
- Name: Main
- Owner: Nourse Line
- Builder: Russel & Company
- Launched: August 1884

History

Norway
- Renamed: Vansa, 1910-11
- Fate: Sank 16 December 1917

General characteristics
- Type: Iron-hulled sailing ship
- Tons burthen: 1,691 tons

The Main was a 1691-ton, iron sailing ship built by Russel & Company for the Nourse Line and launched in August 1884. The ship is recorded as having completed the journey from Sharpness to Calcutta on 20 July 1900 in 100 days but was mainly used to transport Indian indentured labourers to the British colonies. Details of some of these are shown below:

Destination	Date of Arrival	Number of Passengers	Deaths During Voyage
Fiji	30 April 1885	735	n/a
Trinidad	31 October 1891	631	24
Trinidad	1 November 1894	643	21
Trinidad	1 November 1895	651	3
Trinidad	4 November 1896	650	0
Trinidad	21 January 1900	627	4
Trinidad	2 December 1903	602	2
Surinam	15 October 1906	n/a	n/a

The Main was sold to Norwegian owners in 1910-11 and renamed Vansa. She was dismasted on 8 December 1917 and sank 225nm ENE Cape Hatteras on 16 December 1917.

== See also ==
- Indian Indenture Ships to Fiji
- Indians in Fiji
- Indian indenture system
