= Rhine (ship) =

History

United Kingdom
- Owner: Nourse Line
- Builder: Russel & Company, Port Glasgow
- Launched: 10 December 1885

History

Canada
- Owner: R.C. Williams of New Brunswick, 1907; W.H. Chandler, Rhine Shipping Company, Montreal, Canada, 1909; G.I. Dewar, Montreal, 1911

History

United States
- Owner: W. McKissock, Boston, 1915; and finally in 1923 was sold to E.P. Reiss, Boston, 1923, for use as a barge

General characteristics
- Class & type: Iron-hulled sailing ship
- Tons burthen: 1,691 tons
- Length: 257.2 ft.
- Beam: 38.3 ft.
- Draught: 23.1 ft.

The Rhine was a 1,691 ton iron sailing ship with a length of 257.2 feet (78.4 m), breadth of 38.3 feet (11.7 m) and depth of 23.1 feet (7.0 m). She was built by Russel & Company, Port Glasgow for the Nourse Line, named after the river Rhine which starts in Switzerland and flows via the French-German border and the Netherlands to the North Sea, and launched on 10 December 1885. She was primarily used for the transportation of Indian indentured labourers to the colonies. Details of some of these voyages are as follows:

Destination	Date of Arrival	Number of Passengers	Deaths During Voyage
Trinidad	2 October 1888	677	5
Suriname	17 November 1890	n/a	n/a
Trinidad	13 December 1891	657	18
Trinidad	13 November 1892	664	11
Trinidad	23 October 1893	647	9
British Guiana	November 1894	?	?
Trinidad	1 November 1895	680	10
Trinidad	13 December 1896	600	14
Fiji	30 August 1900	491	n/a
Trinidad	27 November 1902	587	2
Trinidad	18 February 1904	621	2
Trinidad	9 May 1905	612	4
Trinidad	9 March 1906	512	2

The Rhine was sold by the Nourse Line in 1907 and passed through a number of owners. It was initially sold to R.C. Williams of New Brunswick, Canada, then in 1909 it was sold to W.H. Chandler, who operated the ship as Rhine Shipping Company, Montreal, Canada. In 1911 the Rhine Shipping Company was sold to G.I. Dewar of Montreal, Canada, then in 1915 it was sold to new owners in Boston, then was sold once more to W. McKissock of Boston and finally in 1923 was sold to E.P. Reiss of Boston for use as a barge. Irfaan Ali's, the President of Guyana, ancestors were brought from India to British Guiana aboard the ship in 1894.

== See also ==
- Indian Indenture Ships to Fiji
- Indian indenture system
