= Howrah (disambiguation) =

Howrah, or Haora, is a city near Kolkata in West Bengal, India.

Howrah or Haora may also refer to:

- Howrah (ship), of the 19th century
- Howrah, Tasmania, a suburb of Hobart, Tasmania, Australia
- Haora River, a river in India
