= Boyne (1877 ship) =

Nourse Line sailing ship

History

United Kingdom
- Name: Boyne
- Builder: T.R. Oswald, Southampton
- Launched: 1877
- Nickname(s): The Hoodoo Ship
- Fate: Wrecked 1886

General characteristics
- Type: Full-rigged ship (1877-1882); Barque (from 1882)
- Tons burthen: 1,403 tons

Boyne was a 1,403 ton, Nourse Line sailing ship that T.R. Oswald of Southampton built in 1877. She was referred to as the "Hoodoo Ship" for the number of mishaps that occurred to her. She wrecked in 1886.

== Voyages on the "Hoodoo Ship" ==
Boyne initially carried migrants to New Zealand.

In 1882, while on a voyage from Liverpool to Barbados, Boyne was caught in a heavy gale in the Bay of Biscay, and as her cargo shifted, she listed dangerously. The captain was washed overboard and the ship was rudderless. The crew were saved by Orchid, whose master, Captain Cook, was satisfied that Boyne could not be saved and she was abandoned.

The derelict Boyne survived, however. A steamer towed her into Falmouth, Cornwall, England, and when she reached Liverpool she underwent a refit. She was re-rigged as a barque with an iron mast. It took a while to find a new master for the ship, but finally Captain N. G. Hatch took command and made his first passage to Calcutta, India, without incident. Under the command of Captain Hatch, Boyne made two voyages carrying indentured labourers from India to Demerara in South America and one voyage to Guadeloupe. She was used to transport Indian indentured labourers to Trinidad, arriving in Trinidad on 31 March 1883 carrying 517 passengers. There were eight deaths during the voyage.

On his next voyage to Demerara, Captain Hatch was taken ill and command of the ship was handed over to the chief officer. As Boyne left Demerara with coal for Calcutta, the hold became heated and the ship could only be saved by throwing the coal overboard.

== Loss of the ship ==
Boyne embarked 537 Indian indentured labourers at Calcutta and carried them to Fiji, arriving at Suva on 26 April 1886. On the return journey to Calcutta, she stranded near False Point in India. The crew and passengers managed to reach shore safely, but attempts to re-float her failed and she was abandoned.

== See also ==
- Indian Indenture Ships to Fiji
- Indian indenture system
