= Bruce (ship) =

Coordinates: 40.6593°N 74.0804°W

History

United Kingdom
- Owner: British Shipowners Company (1866-1880); Nourse Line (from 1880)
- Builder: Aitken Mansell, Glasgow, Scotland
- Launched: 1866
- Acquired: 1880, Nourse Line

General characteristics
- Class & type: Full-rigged ship, Barque
- Tons burthen: 1,200 tons

Bruce was a 1,200-ton sailing ship built in 1866 by Aitken Mansell of Glasgow, Scotland. In 1880 the Nourse Line purchased her from the British Shipowners Company.

== Indian indenture ship ==
On 21 May 1886, Bruce carried 458 Indian indentured labourers to Fiji. In 1889 she was re-rigged as a barque. On 3 January 1889, she carried Indian indentured labourers to Surinam in the West Indies. On 17 November 1890 she arrived in Trinidad with 507 Indian indentured labourers. There were two deaths during the voyage. Bruce also took Indian indentured labourers to Guyana.

== Coal hulk in New York Harbor ==
On 11 February 1891, Bruce capsized in Bayonne, New Jersey, was salvaged and used for coal storage.

== See also ==
- List of Indian indenture ships to Fiji
- Indian indenture system
