= Allanshaw =

British iron sailing ship

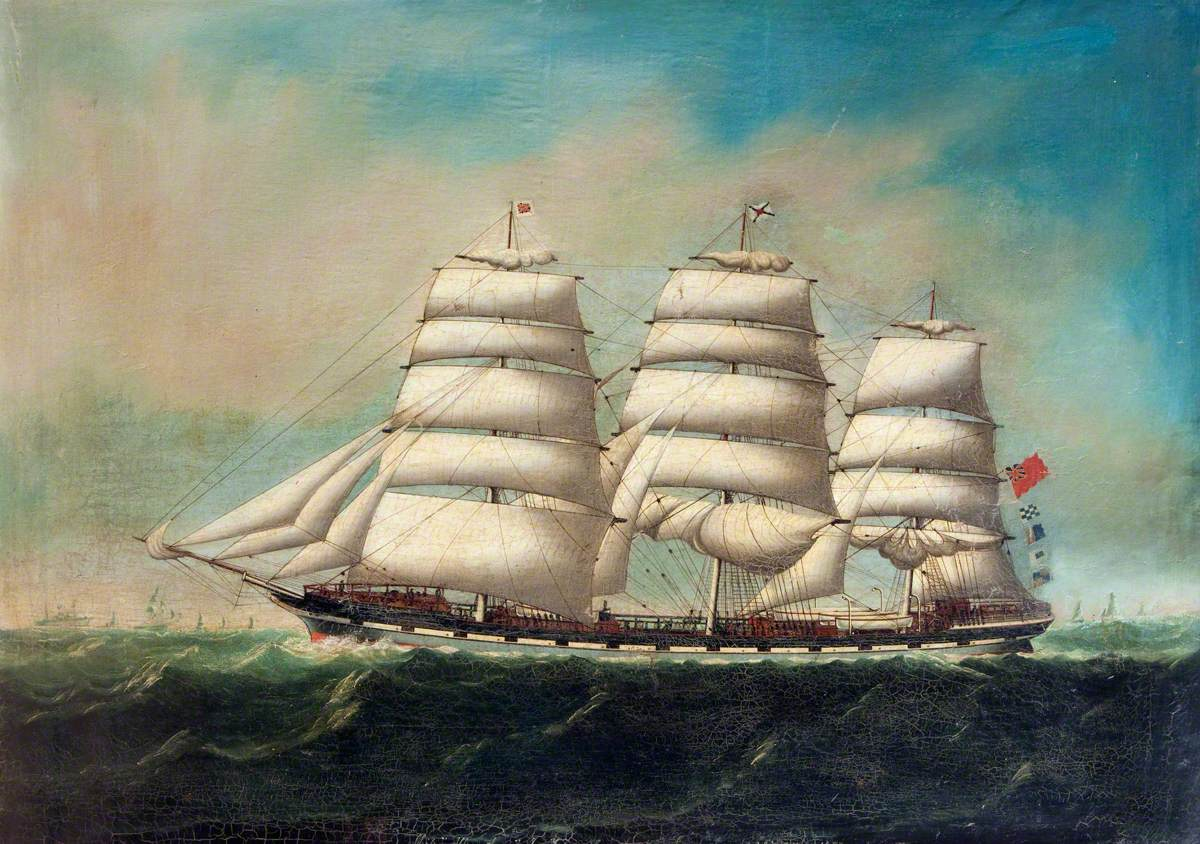

History

United Kingdom
- Owner: J.G. Potter & Company, Liverpool
- Builder: William Simons & Company, Renfrew
- Launched: 29 August 1874
- Acquired: Nourse Line, 26 November 1880
- Fate: Wrecked 23 March 1893

General characteristics
- Class & type: Iron-hulled sailing ship
- Tons burthen: 1,589 tons
- Length: 80.1 m (263 ft)
- Beam: 12.3 m (40 ft)
- Draught: 7.0 m (23.0 ft)

Allanshaw was a 1,589 ton, iron sailing ship with a length of 80.1 metres (263 ft), beam of 12.3 metres (40 ft) and draught of 7.0 metres (23.0 ft). She was built by William Simons & Company of Renfrew for the J.G. Potter & Company of Liverpool and launched on 29 August 1874. She was bought by the Nourse Line on 26 November 1880. She was a fast ship, making the run from London to Sydney in 65 days. On 2 October 1882 she arrived in Australia with new immigrants.

She was primarily used for the transportation of Indian indentured labourers to the colonies. Details of some of these voyages are as follows:

Transport of Indian indentured labourers
Destination	Date of Arrival	Number of Passengers	Deaths During Voyage
Guyana	23 August 1888	unknown	unknown
Fiji	17 June 1890	573	n/a
Trinidad	13 December 1890	658	4
Trinidad	12 October 1892	636	5

On 23 March 1893 she was wrecked on Tristan da Cunha, while en route from Liverpool to Calcutta, carrying salt, with the loss of 3 lives.

== See also ==
- Indian Indenture Ships to Fiji
- Indian indenture system
