= List of shipwrecks in July 1879 =

The list of shipwrecks in July 1879 includes ships sunk, foundered, grounded, or otherwise lost during July 1879.

== 1 July ==
List of shipwrecks: 1 July 1879
Ship	State	Description
Cud	United Kingdom	The yacht sprang a leak and foundered between Great Orme Head, Caernarfonshire and Beaumaris, Anglesey. Her crew were rescued by the steamship King Ja Ja (United Kingdom).
Ethelred	United Kingdom	The steamship ran aground at Kertch, Russia. She was refloated and resumed her voyage.
Flying Dutchman	United Kingdom	The schooner was driven ashore at Ramsey, Isle of Man. Her crew were rescued. She was on a voyage from Caernarfon to Irvine, Ayrshire.
Foam	United Kingdom	The schooner ran aground on Luburcur Beach, near St Anthony's Lighthouse, Cornwall with the loss of two of her crew. She was on a voyage from Plymouth, Devon to Marseille, Bouches-du-Rhône, France.
Jeanne d'Arc	France	The ship struck a sunken rock and sank in the Indian Ocean. Her crew took to a boat; they were rescued on 15 July by the steamship Corsican (United Kingdom).
Orient	United Kingdom	The barque ran aground at Waterford. She was on a voyage from Baltimore, Maryland, United States to Waterford.
President Troplong	France	The steamship ran aground on the Meloria Bank, off Livorno, Italy.
Ville de Carentan	France	The schooner ran aground on The Manacles, Cornwall, United Kingdom and was severely damaged. Her crew were rescued. Ville de Carentan was on a voyage from Carentan, Manche to Llanelly, Glamorgan, United Kingdom. She was later refloated and towed in to Falmouth, Cornwall by the tug Carbon (United Kingdom).
269	Russia	The lighter sank at Saint Petersburg.
Unnamed	United Kingdom	A lighter was driven ashore and wrecked on Shapinsay, Orkney Islands.
Unnamed	United Kingdom	A yacht sank in Liverpool Bay.

== 2 July ==
List of shipwrecks: 2 July 1879
Ship	State	Description
Claude Boye	United Kingdom	The ship ran aground on St. Paul Island, Nova Scotia, Canada. She was on a voyage from Miramichi, New Brunswick, Canada to Liverpool, Lancashire. She was refloated and completed her voyage in a severely leaky condition.
Linda	United Kingdom	The steamship ran aground at "Bulgar Deresi", Ottoman Empire. She was on a voyage from Civitavecchia, Italy to Nicholaieff, Russia. She was refloated with assistance.
Orient	United Kingdom	The ship ran aground at Waterford.

== 3 July ==
List of shipwrecks: 3 July 1879
Ship	State	Description
Inui	Italy	The ship was wrecked at "Elaphonia Laconie", Greece. She was on a voyage from Marianople, Russia to Genoa.

== 4 July ==
List of shipwrecks: 4 July 1879
Ship	State	Description
Amazonia	United Kingdom	The ship was driven ashore at Cape Juby, Morocco. She was on a voyage from Bristol, Gloucestershire to Cape Juby.
Bolivia	United States	The barque caught fire at sea. She was run ashore Elmina, Gold Coast, where she was wrecked. Her crew were rescued.
Tantivy	United Kingdom	The fishing smack was wrecked on Schiermonnikoog, Groningen, Netherlands. Her six crew were rescued.

== 5 July ==
List of shipwrecks: 5 July 1879
Ship	State	Description
Concord	United Kingdom	The brig was run down and sunk in the Thames Estuary by the steamship Winston (United Kingdom). Her crew were rescued. Concord was on a voyage from Goole, Yorkshire to London
Julius	Sweden	The schooner ran aground at Falsterbo. She was on a voyage from Hull, Yorkshire to Norrtälje. She was refloated and taken in to Malmö.
Lottie	United Kingdom	The steamship ran aground at "Bulgar Dersi", Ottoman Empire. She was on a voyage from Liverpool, Lancashire to Galaţi, United Principalities. She was refloated with assistance from the steamship August (Flag unknown), and resumed her voyage on 7 July.
Vigilant	United Kingdom	The steamship ran aground at Goole. She was refloated and resumed her voyage.

== 6 July ==
List of shipwrecks: 6 July 1879
Ship	State	Description
Albert	United Kingdom	The brigantine sprang a leak and sank off Cézembre, Ille-et-Vilaine, France. Her crew were rescued. She was on a voyage from St. Ubes, Portugal to Swansea, Glamorgan.
Vivid	United Kingdom	The smack was driven ashore at Shoreham-by-Sea, Sussex. She was on a voyage from Saint-Vaast-la-Hougue, Manche, France to Shoreham-by-Sea.

== 7 July ==
List of shipwrecks: 7 July 1879
Ship	State	Description
Ann Morgan	United Kingdom	The ship ran aground at Bideford, Devon. She was on a voyage from Stettin, Germany to Bristol, Gloucestershire. She was refloated and taken in to Appledore, Devon.
Betaina	Norway	The ship ran aground. She was refloated and taken in to Harlingen, Friesland, Netherlands in a leaky condition.
Kjeck	Norway	The ship ran aground. She was refloated and taken in to Harlingen in a leaky condition.
Marina	United Kingdom	The yacht was wrecked on the Oaze Sand, off the north Kent coast. All eight people on board survived. She was on a voyage from Ramsgate to Gravesend, Kent.
Pauline	United Kingdom	The barque was wrecked at Grays Harbor, Washington, United States with the loss of twenty of her 22 crew.
Sedgemoor	United Kingdom	The steamship ran aground at Lavernock Point, Glamorgan and was severely damaged.

== 8 July ==
List of shipwrecks: 8 July 1879
Ship	State	Description
Bohemian, or Bothnia	Norway	The barque collided with the barque Arthur White (United Kingdom) and ran aground at Blackrock, County Dublin, United Kingdom.
John Paterson	United Kingdom	The ship put in to Rio de Janeiro, Brazil on fire. She was on a voyage from Ardrossan, Ayrshire to San Francisco, California, United States.
Roses	United Kingdom	The steamship was hit by a cannonball in Morecambe Bay, which injured at least four of her passengers. The cannonball had been fired by the Leeds Artillery Volunteers. Roses was on a pleasure excuresion.
Sedgemoor	United Kingdom	The steamship ran aground off Penarth, Glamorgan. She was refloated and put back to Cardiff, Glamorgan in a leaky condition.
Vooruit	Flag unknown	The ship foundered 26 nautical miles (48 km) off Les Sables-d'Olonne, Vendée, France. She was on a voyage from Runcorn, Cheshire, United Kingdom to La Rochelle, Charente-Inférieure, France.

== 9 July ==
List of shipwrecks: 9 July 1879
Ship	State	Description
Ellen M. Mitchell	United States	The ship grounded at Egremont, Lancashire, United Kingdom. She was on a voyage from "Shulee" or "Schulu", Nova Scotia to Liverpool, Lancashire. She got off on the same day.
Emma	Sweden	The barque ran aground and sank at Cuxhaven, Germany. Her crew were rescued.
Madonna	United Kingdom	The ship put into Belfast Lough, leaking, and was beached at Whitehouse, County Antrim. She was on a voyage from Ayr to Newry.
Mary Kellow	United Kingdom	The schooner struck a rock at Stornoway, Isle of Lewis, Outer Hebrides and was damaged. She was on a voyage from Liverpool, Lancashire to Fraserburgh, Aberdeenshire.

== 10 July ==
List of shipwrecks: 10 July 1879
Ship	State	Description
Congou	United Kingdom	The barque ran aground on the Flemish Bank, in the North Sea off the coast of West Flanders, Belgium. She was on a voyage from Hull, Yorkshire to Buenos Aires, Argentina. She was refloated and put in to Lowestoft, Suffolk in a leaky condition.
Magnet	United Kingdom	The fishing smack was run into by the schooner Bessie (United Kingdom) and sank at Plymouth, Devon with the loss of a crew member.
Pia	Italy	The barque was driven ashore at Cap-Haïtien, Haiti. She was refloated and taken in to Saint Thomas, Danish Virgin Islands in a leaky condition. She was placed under repair.
Two Brothers	United Kingdom	The schooner sprang a leak and foundered 4 1/2 nautical miles (8.3 km) off The Maidens, County Antrim. Her crew survived. She was on a voyage from Ayr to Belfast, County Antrim.
Vittorio Emannele	Regia Marina	The frigate was stranded on a shoal off Ischia. She was refloated on 22 July.

== 11 July ==
List of shipwrecks: 11 July 1879
Ship	State	Description
Day Dawn	New Zealand	The schooner hit rocks at Mākaro / Ward Island in Wellington Harbour, severely holing her hull. She became a total wreck.
James Groves	United Kingdom	The steamship ran abround at Dunkirk, Nord, France. She was on a voyage from Brăila, United Principalities to Dunkirk. She was refloated the next day and taken in to Dunkirk.
Louise	United Kingdom	The schooner ran aground and was wrecked at Maassluis, South Holland, Netherlands with the loss of a crew member. She was on a voyage from Methil, Fife to Rotterdam, South Holland.
Simon Bolivar	United States of Colombia	The steamship was wrecked at Barranquilla.
Unnamed	France	A lighter was run into by the steamship Seaton (United Kingdom) and sank at Bordeaux, Gironde.

== 12 July ==
List of shipwrecks: 12 July 1879
Ship	State	Description
Alexandra	France	The barque was wrecked at Boa Vista, Cape Verde Islands. Her crew were rescued. she was on a voyage from Marseille, Bouches-du-Rhône to Whydah, Dahomey.
Spray	United Kingdom	The brig collided with the steamship City of Khios (Flag unknown) in the River Mersey and was beached at New Ferry, Cheshire. Spray was on a voyage from Runcorn, Cheshire to Jersey, Channel Islands.
State of Virginia	United Kingdom	The steamship went ashore on the eastern end of Cape Sable Island, Nova Scotia, Canada with the loss of ten of the 136 people on board. Survivors were rescued from the island by HMS Griffon (Royal Navy). State of Virginia was on a voyage from New York, United States to Glasgow, Renfrewshire.

== 13 July ==
List of shipwrecks: 13 July 1879
Ship	State	Description
Albert Victor	United Kingdom	The steamboat suffered a structural failure and sank. All on board, more than 100 people, survived. She was on a voyage from Pyewipe, Lincolnshire to Lincoln.
Bahia, and Rolondo	Brazil; United Kingdom	The ships collided at Rio de Janeiro and were both beached. Rolondo was on a voyage from Fray Bentos, Uruguay to London.
Charles Townshend Hook	United Kingdom	The steamship was driven ashore at Heraclitza Point, Ottoman Empire. She was on a voyage from Brăila, United Principalities to Malta.

== 14 July ==
List of shipwrecks: 14 July 1879
Ship	State	Description
Annette	Norway	The brig ran aground on the Carr Rock, off the coast of Fife, United Kingdom and was run ashore at Fife Ness. Her crew were rescued. She was on a voyage from Christiania to Leith, Lothian, United Kingdom.
Balaclava	United Kingdom	The steamship ran aground at Llanelly, Glamorgan. She was on a voyage from Maryport, Cumberland to Llanelly.
Princess Royal	United Kingdom	The barge sprang a leak and sank at Harwich, Essex.
Sarah Ann	United Kingdom	The steamship ran aground at Ochakov, Russia. She was on a voyage from Odesa, Russia to Malta.

== 15 July ==
List of shipwrecks: 15 July 1879
Ship	State	Description
Léon et Gabrielle	France	The brigantine collided with the steamship Gustaf Fauberg (Flag unknown) and sank in the English Channel off the Isle of Wight, United Kingdom. Her eight crew were rescued by Gustaf Fauberg. Léon et Gabrielle was on a voyage from "Saint Louis" to Africa.
Maria	United Kingdom	The schooner sank off Dubh Artach, Argyllshire. Her crew were resched. She was on a voyage from Runcorn, Cheshire to Newcastle upon Tyne, Northumberland.

== 16 July ==
List of shipwrecks: 16 July 1879
Ship	State	Description
Catharina	Germany	The brig sprang a leak and sank in the Atlantic Ocean. Her crew took to a boat; they were rescued by the barque Montana (Germany). Catharina was on a voyage from London, United Kingdom to Santos, Brazil.
Dinnington	United Kingdom	The steamship ran aground in the River Ouse and was damaged. She was on a voyage from Goole, Yorkshire to Rouen, Seine-Inférieure, France. She was refloated and put back to Goole.
John Rose	United States	The schooner was wrecked 2 nautical miles (3.7 km) north of Life Saving Station No. 5, 5th District on the Maryland shore, a total loss. Her crew made it to shore in her boat.
Little Vixen	United Kingdom	The schooner ran aground at Fort Blockhouse, Portsmouth, Hampshire. She was on a voyage from A Coruña, Spain to Portsmouth. She was refloated.
W. T. Harward	Canada	The barque struck a rock off Tory Island, County Donegal, United Kingdom and developed a severe leak. She was on a voyage from Baltimore, Maryland, United States to Londonderry. She was towed into Moville, County Donegal by the tug Admiral (United Kingdom) on 18 July.

== 17 July ==
List of shipwrecks: 17 July 1879
Ship	State	Description
Abergrange	United Kingdom	The steamship ran aground in the Scheldt. She was on a voyage from Antwerp, Belgium to Grangemouth, Stirlingshire. She was refloated and resumed her voyage.
Albatross	United Kingdom	The sailing barge ran aground in the River Colne. She was then run into by the schooner Joys (United Kingdom).

== 18 July ==
List of shipwrecks: 18 July 1879
Ship	State	Description
Albert Victor	United Kingdom	The steamship foundered. All on board, more than 100 people, were rescued. She was on a voyage from Lincoln to Grimsby, Lincolnshire.
Eex	Norway	The barque ran aground at Soldier's Point, County Louth, United Kingdom. She was on a voyage from Saint John, New Brunswick, Canada to Dundalk, County Louth.
Illimani	United Kingdom	The steamship was wrecked on Mocha Island, Chile. All on board were rescued. She was on a voyage from Liverpool to Valparaíso, Chile.
Our Queen	United Kingdom	The steam whaler was crushed by ice in the Admiralty Inlet. Her 29 crew were rescued by Ravenscraig and Nova Zembla (both United Kingdom).
Recco Secundo	Italy	The barque was driven ashore on Heligoland. She was on a voyage from Antofagasta, Chile to Cuxhaven, Germany. She was refloated and taken in to Cuxhaven in a leaky condition.

== 19 July ==
List of shipwrecks: 19 July 1879
Ship	State	Description
Arthur Wakefield	New Zealand	The schooner foundered after she began shipping water during a heavy sea off New Zealand's Taranaki coast.
Norfolk	United Kingdom	The ship was wrecked off Boa Vista Island, Cape Verde Islands. Her crew survived. She was on a voyage from Bathurst, Gambia Colony to Marseille, Bouches-du-Rhône, France.
North British	United Kingdom	The steamship ran aground on rocks off Garwick Point, Isle of Man. All on board were rescued. She was on a voyage from Silloth, Cumberland to Douglas, Isle of Man and Dublin or vice versa. She subsequently floated off and sank.
Unnamed	France	A lighter was driven ashore and wrecked at "Brienne", Gironde.

== 20 July ==
List of shipwrecks: 20 July 1879
Ship	State	Description
Awthron	Greece	The steamship ran aground in the Danube 43 nautical miles (80 km) from its mouth.
Chrysomene	United Kingdom	The ship ran aground in Melancholy Sound. She was on a voyage from Calcutta, India to Dundee, Forfarshire. She was refloated and resumed her voyage.
Naiad	United Kingdom	The schooner was wrecked on The Manacles, Cornwall during a south-west gale and poor visibility. Her crew survived. She was on a voyage from Port Talbot, Glamorgan to Falmouth, Cornwall.
Olivia	United Kingdom	The lighter sank at Liverpool, Lancashire.
Prussia	United Kingdom	The lighter sank in the River Mersey. All on board survived. She was on a voyage from Runcorn, Cheshire to Liverpool.
Rose of Devon	United Kingdom	The yawl was driven ashore at Southsea, Hampshire. She was refloated with the assistance of the tug Ranger (United Kingdom).
Susan Ellen	Germany	The schooner was wrecked on the Black Carr Rocks, on the coast of Northumberland, United Kingdom. Her five crew survived. She was on a voyage from Föhr to Amble, Northumberland.
Three Brothers	United Kingdom	The smack was wrecked in Braifa Bay, Devon with the loss of both crew. She was on a voyage from Appledore, Devon to Newport, Monmouthshire.
Zephyrus	United Kingdom	The barque was driven ashore and wrecked at Cymyran, Anglesey. Her fourteen crew were rescued by the Rhosneigr Lifeboat Thomas Lingham ( Royal National Lifeboat Institution). She was on a voyage from Jamaica to Liverpool.
Unnamed	United Kingdom	A Mersey flat capsized in the River Mersey.

== 21 July ==
List of shipwrecks: 21 July 1879
Ship	State	Description
Arab	United Kingdom	The ship was wrecked at Croyde, Devon with the loss of two of her crew. She was on a voyage from Liverpool, Lancashire to Southampton, Hampshire.
Athole	United Kingdom	The steamship ran aground off Gourock, Renfrewshire. She was refloated.
Aurora	United Kingdom	The steamship ran aground on the Kopper Stones, north of Gotland, Sweden. She was on a voyage from Dundee, Forfarshire to Sundsvall, Sweden. She was refloated with assistance and resumed her voyage.
Braemar	Norway	The barque was driven ashore at Zierikzee, North Holland, Netherlands. She was on a voyage from Örnsköldsvik, Sweden to Antwerp, Belgium. She was refloated with assistance from Boa (Netherlands).
Fanny	United Kingdom	The ship was driven ashore at Équihen, Pas-de-Calais, France with the loss of all hands. She was on a voyage from Portsmouth, Hampshire to Dieppe, Seine-Inférieure, France.
Gipsey	United Kingdom	The schooner was driven ashore at Rock Ferry, Cheshire.
Helen Susan	United Kingdom	The ship was driven ashore and wrecked 2 nautical miles (3.7 km) north of Warkworth, Northumberland. She was on a voyage from Wyk auf Föhr, Germany to Warkworth.
Lorenzo Semprum	Flag unknown	The steamship ran aground at Deva, Spain. She was refloated the next day.
Louisa	United Kingdom	The ship was driven ashore at Newtown, Isle of Wight. She was on a voyage from Cowes, Isle of Wight to Exeter, Devon. She was refloated with the assistance of a tug and resumed her voyage.
S. A. Hawthorne	United Kingdom	The barge foundered off Margate, Kent. Two crew were saved.
St. Bernards	Canada	The steamship ran aground and sank off Vlissingen, Zeeland, Netherlands with the loss of seven lives. She was on a voyage from New York, United States to Antwerp, Belgium.
Sultana	United Kingdom	The steamship struck rocks at Gourock and was beached.
Timour	United Kingdom	The barque was driven ashore at New Brighton, Cheshire. She was on a voyage from Quebec City, Canada to Liverpool. She was refloated and taken in to Liverpool.
Volunte de Dieu	France	The ship foundered 3 nautical miles (5.6 km) off Nice, Alpes-Maritimes. Her crew were rescued. She was on a voyage from Marseille, Bouches-du-Rhône to Nice.
Wave	United Kingdom	The steamship went ashore at Stefano Point, near Constantinople, Ottoman Empire. She was on a voyage from Newport, Monmouthshire to Sulina, Romania.

== 22 July ==
List of shipwrecks: 22 July 1879
Ship	State	Description
Carrie Annie, and Marinho Primero	United Kingdom; Brazil	The schooner Carrie Annie, on voyage from Cádiz, Spain and Rio de Janeiro to Rio Grande, Brazil, collided 50 nautical miles (93 km) from her destination with the schooner Marinho Primero and sank. Her crew were rescued by Harry Emmet (United Kingdom). Marinho Primero later arrived at Rio Grande, heavily damaged.
Craiglands	United Kingdom	The steamship departed from Hong Kong for Yokohama, Japan. No further trace, reported overdue.
Croft	United Kingdom	The steamship ran aground at Cette, Hérault, France. She was on a voyage from Odesa, Russia to Cette. She was refloated.
Ellen	United Kingdom	The ship was driven ashore and wrecked near Dieppe, Seine-Inférieure, France. She was on a voyage from Dieppe to a Scottish port.
Italia	Italy	The ship departed from Rodrigues for Mauritius in a leaky condition. No further trace.
Otto Eichmann	Germany	The steamship was driven ashore at "South Nasby", Öland, Sweden. She was on a voyage from Gävle, Sweden to London, United Kingdom. She was refloated on 27 July and taken in to Oskarshamn.
Robert Burns	United Kingdom	The steamship ran aground on the Chapel Rock, in the Carlingford Lough.
Tambaroora	New South Wales	The steamship was wrecked on Masthead Island, Queensland.

== 23 July ==
List of shipwrecks: 23 July 1879
Ship	State	Description
Annie and Catherine	United Kingdom	The ship was driven ashore. She was refloated and taken in to the Larne Lough.
Behrend	Germany	The barque was driven ashore at La Tunara, Spain.
Nora	France	The yacht ran aground on the Mussel Scarp. She was refloated and taken in to Wallsend, Northumberland, United Kingdom for repairs.
Zigzag	United Kingdom	The schooner ran aground at Liverpool, Lancashire. She was on a voyage from Pomaron, Guadiana river, Portugal to Liverpool. She was refloated and taken in to Liverpool.

== 24 July ==
List of shipwrecks: 24 July 1879
Ship	State	Description
Esbjorn	Norway	The brig was driven ashore and sank north of Landskrona, Sweden. She was on a voyage from Nyhamn to Grimsby, Lincolnshire, United Kingdom.
Heather Bell	New Zealand	The cutter ran aground on a reef near the northern tip of Coromandel Peninsula, New Zealand. She became a total wreck.
Louise	United Kingdom	The cuttter ran aground on the Banjaard Sand, in the North Sea off the Dutch coast.
Ocean	Norway	The schooner ran aground on the Lillegrunden, in the Baltic Sea. She was on a voyage from Skutskär, Sweden to Bordeaux, Gironde, France. She was refloated with assistance of a steamship and taken in to Copenhagen, Denmark.
Rhiwindda	United Kingdom	The steamship ran aground in the Swash Channel. She was on a voyage from New York, United States to Cardiff, Glamorgan. She was refloated and resumed her voyage.
Schiedam	Netherlands	The ship ran aground at Maassluis, South Holland. She was on a voyage from New York to Rotterdam, South Holland. She was refloated.

== 25 July ==
List of shipwrecks: 25 July 1879
Ship	State	Description
Azela	United Kingdom	The brig was driven ashore near the Knuds Head, Denmark. She was on a voyage from Blyth, Northumberland to Vyborg, Grand Duchy of Finland.
Edith	United Kingdom	The schooner ran aground in the River Medina. She was on a voyage from Cowes, Isle of Wight to Dublin. She was later refloated and towed back to Cowes.
Eliza	United Kingdom	The schooner ran aground in the River Medina. She was on a voyage from West Cowes, Isle of Wight to Dublin. She was refloated and towed back to the Medina Cement Works.
Hawlbowline	Norway	The barque ran aground on the Maplin Sand, in the North Sea off the coast of Essex, United Kingdom. She was on a voyage from Kragerø to the Regent's Canal, London.
Osterlide	Norway	The barque ran aground on the Goodwin Sands, Kent, United Kingdom. Her eleven crew were taken off the next day by the tug Daring (United Kingdom). Osterlide was on a voyage from New York, United States to Stettin, Germany. The wreck was abandoned, but later salved by Deal boatmen and towed to the River Thames on 10 August for auction.
Perseverance	United Kingdom	The barque was wrecked in the Magdalen Islands, Nova Scotia, Canada. She was on a voyage from Quebec City, Canada to South Shields, County Durham.
Southern Rights	United States	The ship was abandoned in the Atlantic Ocean (43°48′N 22°40′W). Her seventeen crew were rescued by the steamship Royal Irish (United Kingdom). Southern Rights was on a voyage from Liverpool, Lancashire, United Kingdom to New York.

== 27 July ==
List of shipwrecks: 27 July 1879
Ship	State	Description
Becherdass Ambaidass	United Kingdom	The barque struck a reef in dense fog and went ashore, becoming a wreck, about 5 miles (8.0 km) south of the Cape Beale Light, Vancouver Island, British Columbia. She was on a voyage from Shanghai for Moodyville, Vancouver; her crew were rescued by Indians.
Maipu	United Kingdom	The barque was wrecked in Hell Bay on Bryher, Isles of Scilly. All seventeen crew were rescued. She was bound from Iquique, Peru to Hamburg, Germany.
River Lune	United Kingdom	The barque was wrecked on Brothers Rock in Muncoy Neck, the channel between Annet and Melledgan, Isles of Scilly. Her crew reached St Agnes, Isles of Scilly in the ship's boats. She was on a voyage from Lorient, Morbihan, France to Ardrossan, Ayrshire.
Skelefteå	Sweden	The brig ran aground on the Minor Grounds, in the Baltic Sea north east of Kastrup, Denmark. She was on a voyage from Newcastle upon Tyne, Northumberland to Copenhagen, Denmark. She was refloated and resumed her voyage.
Unnamed	Austria-Hungary	A ship sank in a storm at Trieste.
22 unnamed vessels	Flags unknown	Many ships were driven ashore and in a storm at Trieste.

== 28 July ==
List of shipwrecks: 28 July 1879
Ship	State	Description
Dryad	United Kingdom	The schooner was driven ashore at Islandmagee, County Antrim. She was on a voyage from Swansea, Glamorgan to Larne, County Antrim.

== 29 July ==
List of shipwrecks: 29 July 1879
Ship	State	Description
Agenoria	United Kingdom	The schooner sprang a leak and sank in the Irish Sea 10 nautical miles (19 km) east of Point Lynas, Anglesey. Her crew were rescued. She was on a voyage from Garston, Lancashire to Rostrevor, County Antrim.
Ayr	United Kingdom	The ship struck a sunken wreck 1 1/2 nautical miles (2.8 km) off Portpatrick, Wigtownshire and was holed. She was on a voyage from Ayr to Silloth, Cumberland. She was beached at Portpatrick and resumed her voyage after temporary repairs were made.
Eagle	United Kingdom	The ship foundered 20 nautical miles (37 km) north north east of the Bishop Rock, Cornwall. Her crew survived. She was on a voyage from Swansea, Glamorgan to Dublin

== 30 July ==
List of shipwrecks: 30 July 1879
Ship	State	Description
Alcazer	United Kingdom	The steamship collided with the steamship Flamingo (United Kingdom) and sank off Ouessant, Finistère, France. Flamingo took the crew to Dartmouth, Devon. Alcazer was on a voyage from Cardiff, Glamorgan to Les Sables d'Olonne, Vendée, France
Argo	Norway	The barque collided with the steamship Clandon (United Kingdom) in the English Channel and was severely damaged. She was on a voyage from Härnösand, Sweden to Brest, Finistère. She was towed in to Plymouth, Devon in a waterlogged condition by Clandon.
Ayr	United Kingdom	The ship struck a sunken wreck and was beached at Portpatrick, Wigtownshire. She was on a voyage from Ayr to Silloth, Cumberland. She was temporarily repaired and resumed her voyage.
Dart	United Kingdom	The ketch ran aground on the Gurnard Ledge, off the Isle of Wight. She was on a voyage from Poole, Dorset to London. She was refloated and beached at Cowes, Isle of Wight.
Egvaag	Norway	The ship ran aground on the Goodwin Sands, Kent, United Kingdom. She was on a voyage from Nordmaling, Sweden to Honfleur, Manche, France. She was refloated with assistance from a tug and taken in to Ramsgate, Kent.
Louisa Walt	United Kingdom	The ship was driven ashore and wrecked at Mossoró, Brazil.
Martha	United Kingdom	The schooner ran aground at Caernarfon.
558	Russia	The lighter was severely damaged by fire at Kronstadt.

== 31 July ==
List of shipwrecks: 31 July 1879
Ship	State	Description
Abel	Netherlands	The barque was destroyed by fire 70 nautical miles (130 km) north east of São Vicente, Cape Verde Islands. Her crew were rescued. She was on a voyage from Newcastle upon Tyne, Northumberland, United Kingdom to Aceh, Sumatra, Netherlands East Indies.
Cordova	United Kingdom	The steamship was wrecked on Molène, Finistère, France. All on board were rescued, eight by a lifeboat. She was on a voyage from Huelva, Spain to the River Tyne.
Johanna	France	The steamship ran aground at Cabrita Point, Gibraltar. She was on a voyage from Cagliari, Sardinia, Italy to Cardiff, Glamorgan, United Kingdom.
Josephine	United States	The yacht capsized with the loss of five lives.
Mabel Young	United Kingdom	The barque foundered 30 nautical miles (56 km) south east of Algoa Bay on a voyage from Calcutta, India to Dundee, Forfarshire.
Pericles	United Kingdom	The passenger ship grounded on Penere Point, on the shore-side of The Manacles, The Lizard and refloated on a rising tide two hours later. The ship continued on her journey to Sydney with 496 emigrants, and on the following day headed for Plymouth for repairs to a leak in the fore peak.
Thomas Lea	United Kingdom	The steamship ran aground on the Corton Sand, in the North Sea off the coast of Suffolk. She was refloated and resumed her voyage.

== Unknown date ==
List of shipwrecks: Unknown date in July 1879
Ship	State	Description
Arab	United Kingdom	The schooner was holed by her anchor and sank at Lytham St. Annes, Lancashire.
B. L.	France	The ship was wrecked on the coast of New Zealand. She was on a voyage from San Francisco, California, United States to Lyttelton, New Zealand.
Bloodhound	United Kingdom	The steamship ran aground in Cloughy Bay, County Down, Ireland. She was refloated and beached.
Border Chieftain	United Kingdom	The steamship ran aground on the Kinburn Spit. She was on a voyage from Kertch, Russia to Malta. She had been refloated by 11 July and resumed her voyage.
Buena Ventura	Spain	The steamship was driven ashore near Cárdenas, Cuba. She was on a voyage from Matanzas to Cárdenas.
Burgos	United Kingdom	The steamship was driven ashore at, or foundered off, Cape Pine, Newfoundland Colony. She was on a voyage from Montreal, Quebec, Canada to London. She subsequently foundered.
Carrie Anne	United Kingdom	The ship collided with a Brazilian schooner and sank. Her crew survived.
Charlotte Gladstone	United Kingdom	The ship was abandoned off the Cape of Good Hope, Cape Colony before 10 July. Her crew were rescued by Halton Castle (United Kingdom). Charlotte Gladstone was on a voyage from Moulmein, Burma to Falmouth, Cornwall. She was later discovered by Halton Castle (United Kingdom), which put some of her crew aboard. She was taken in to Cape Town, Cape Colony on 11 August.
Colonel Fytche	United Kingdom	The ship foundered at sea. She was on a voyage from Rangoon, Burma to Madras, India.
Cyprus	United Kingdom	The ship was driven ashore on Anticosti Island, Nova Scotia, Canada. She was on a voyage from Quebec City, Canada to Liverpool. She was refloated and put back to Quebec City in a leaky condition.
Dayspring	United Kingdom	The ketch ran aground on the Castle Rocks, off the Isle of Wight. She was on a voyage from the Hurst Castle, Hampshire to Hull, Yorkshire. She was refloated and resumed her voyage.
Elise	Germany	The schooner was driven ashore and wrecked in Struys Bay, Cape Colony, southern Africa.
Elpis	United Kingdom	The ship ran aground in the Schuylkill River. She was on a voyage from Cartagena, Spain to Philadelphia, Pennsylvania, United States. She was refloated with assistance.
Ernte	Germany	The galiot was driven ashore and wrecked on Skagen, Denmark.
Fanny	United Kingdom	The ship was wrecked at Équihen, Pas-de-Calais, France with the loss of all hands. She was on a voyage from Portsmouth, Hampshire to Dieppe, Seine-Inférieure, France.
Fort France	France	The barque went ashore and was later refloated, then taken to Saint Thomas, Virgin Islands.
George	United Kingdom	The ship caught fire at Trois-Rivières, Quebec. She was on a voyage from Trois-Rivières to the River Plate.
Giulia	Italy	The barque ran aground at Gibraltar. She was on a voyage from Genoa to Buenos Aires, Argentina. She was refloated.
Gipsy	United Kingdom	The schooner was driven ashore at Rock Ferry, Cheshire.
Gladiolus	United Kingdom	The ship was abandoned in the Atlantic Ocean before 1 August.
Grev Wieder Jarlsberg	Norway	The ship was driven ashore in the Nieuw Diep. She was on a voyage from Drammen to Purmerend, North Holland, Netherlands.
Harmonie	Flag unknown	The ship was driven ashore at Saint Thomas, Canada. She was refloated with slight damage.
Helena	Germany	The brig was abandoned in the Atlantic Ocean. Her crew were rescued. She was on a voyage from "Tuyu" to the English Channel.
Helena	Sweden	The ship sank in the North Sea. Her crew were rescued by Wala (Denmark) Helena was on a voyage from Grangemouth, Stirlingshire, United Kingdom to Stockholm.
Henriette	Germany	The brig was driven ashore at the mouth of the Rio Grande. Her crew were rescued. She was on a voyage from Papenburg to the Rio Grande.
Hispania	United Kingdom	The ship ran aground on the Skerweather Sands, in the Bristol Channel. She was refloated and towed in to Swansea, Glamorgan.
James Shepherd	United Kingdom	The ship ran aground in the Balabac Strait. She was on a voyage from "Zebu" to London. She was refloated two days later and resumed her voyage.
J. E. Fisher	United Kingdom	The barque was driven ashore at Cangrejo Arriba, Puerto Rico. She was on a voyage from Liverpool, Lancashire to San Juan, Puerto Rico. She was later refloated and taken in to Saint Thomas.
Jesse	Belgium	The ship was wrecked on New Year's Island, on the coast of Patagonia. Her crew survived.
Jylland	United Kingdom	The steamship ran aground at Maassluis, South Holland, Netherlands. She was on a voyage from Kronstadt, Russia to Rotterdam, South Holland. She was refloated with the assistance of some tugs.
Krishna	United Kingdom	The steamship was driven ashore at "Raree", on the Malabar Coast 10 nautical miles (19 km) south of Vengurla, India. She was declared a total loss. Krishna was salvaged in 1881, repaired and returned to service.
Lady Belhaven	United Kingdom	The full-rigged ship ran aground on the Argo flat, at the mouth of the Mutlah River. At least some of her crew were rescued. She was on a voyage from London to Calcutta, India. She subsequently became a wreck.
Laurel	United Kingdom	The ship ran aground on the Pan Shoal. She was on a voyage from Fremantle, Western Australia to Singapore, Straits Settlements.
Leviathan	United Kingdom	The ship sank in the Humber off "Skitterhaven", Lincolnshire. She was on a voyage from Grimsby, Yorkshirefv to Hull.
Lizzie	United Kingdom	The ship was driven ashore at Bridgehampton, New York. She was on a voyage from New York to London.
Louise Charlotte	Germany	The barque capsized at the mouth of the Gironde. Her crew were rescued. She was on a voyage from Bordeaux, Gironde, France to Quebec City, Canada.
Manna	France	The brig was run down and sunk at La Guaira, Venezuela by the steamship Bolivar (United Kingdom). All on board were rescued.
Marguerite	France	The ship struck a rock off Les Sables-d'Olonne, Vendée and was wrecked. Her crew were rescued.
Maria Pauna	(Russian Empire) Grand Duchy of Finland	The brig was driven ashore and wrecked at the Pointe du Hourdel, Somme, France. She was on a voyage from Örnsköldsvik, Sweden to Saint-Valery-sur-Somme, Somme.
Mary Anne	United Kingdom	The ship ran aground at Grimsby.
Mic-Mac	United Kingdom	The ship was driven ashore. She was refloated and put in to Cape Town, Cape Colony.
Morning Star	United Kingdom	The brig was driven ashore and wrecked at Anadolu Kavağı, Ottoman Empire. Her crew were rescued. She was on a voyage from Constantinople to Trebizond, Ottoman Empire.
Nellie	United Kingdom	The steamship ran aground at Ven, Sweden.
Nimrod	Norway	The barque was wrecked on the Colorados. She was on a voyage from Jamaica to London.
Novgorod	Imperial Russian Navy	The monitor ran aground off Odesa and was damaged.
Oriana	United Kingdom	The barque ran aground at Darien, Georgia, United States. She was on a voyage from Darien to a British port. She was refloated and put back to Darien.
Parthenon	Greece	The steamship sank in the Sulina branch of the Danube 43 nautical miles (80 km) from its mouth.
Perseverance	United Kingdom	The ship was wrecked in the Magdalen Islands, Nova Scotia, Canada.
Peru	United Kingdom	The barque ran aground on the Cockle Rock, off Galway. She was on a voyage from Philadelphia to Galway. She was refloated on 14 July with the assistance of a tug.
Queen of the Age	United Kingdom	The barque ran aground in the Hooghly River at Budge Budge, India. She was refloated and taken in to Calcutta.
Rolando	Italy	The brig collided with another vessel and was severely damaged. She was on a voyage from Fray Bentos, Uruguay to Falmouth. She put in to Rio de Janeiro, Brazil in a sinking condition.
Scandinavian	United Kingdom	The steamship ran aground in Lake St. Peter. She was on a voyage from Quebec City to Liverpool.
Skandia	(Russian Empire) Grand Duchy of Finland	The schooner ran aground on the Goodwin Sands. She was on a voyage from Havre de Grâce, Seine-Inférieure, France to Gävle, Sweden. She was refloated and assisted in to Ramsgate.
Walfried	Sweden	The schooner struck a rock a Cape Arkona, Rügen, Germany. She was on a voyage from Sandarne to Swinemünde, Germany. She put in to Lübeck, Germany in a leaky condition and was placed under repair.
Wilhelmine	Netherlands	The brig was driven ashore on Öland, Sweden. She was on a voyage from Härnösand, Sweden to Weymouth, Dorset, United Kingdom. She was refloated and taken in to Køge, Denmark for repairs.
