= Danube (ship) =

History

United Kingdom
- Name: Danube
- Owner: Nourse Line
- Launched: 1890
- Fate: Disappeared 1892

General characteristics
- Tons burthen: 1,459 tons

Danube, a 1,459-ton sailing ship named after the second longest river in Europe, was built in 1890 for the Nourse Line.

On 15 June 1891, Danube made a voyage to Fiji carrying 591 Indian indentured labourers. She also made a trip to Trinidad carrying 609 passengers, arriving on 1 January 1892; there were 29 deaths during this voyage.

Later in 1892, Danube disappeared during a voyage from Guadeloupe to New York City. Her fate remains a mystery.

== See also ==
- Indian Indenture Ships to Fiji
