= Rhone (ship) =

Iron sailing ship

History

United Kingdom
- Name: Gilroy
- Owner: Gilroy, Sons & Company, Dundee
- Builder: John Elder, Glasgow, Scotland
- Launched: 1875
- Owner: Nourse Line
- Acquired: 1889
- Renamed: Rhone

History

Norway
- Acquired: 1905
- Renamed: Dybvaag

General characteristics
- Class & type: Iron-hulled sailing ship
- Tons burthen: 1,768 tons
- Length: 259.2 ft.
- Beam: 39.9 ft.
- Draught: 23.2 ft.

The Rhone, formerly known as Gilroy, was a 1,768 ton, iron sailing ship with a length of 259.2 feet, breadth of 39.9 feet and depth of 23.2 feet.

== History ==
Details of some of the Rhone's voyages
Destination	Date of arrival	Number of passengers	Deaths during voyage
Fiji	15 May 1890	585	n/a
Trinidad	9 October 1891	677	16
Trinidad	23 October 1892	666	4
Trinidad	28 October 1893	653	4
Trinidad	4 October 1894	662	8
Trinidad	16 October 1895	690	109
Fiji	11 May 1897	653	n/a
Trinidad	10 November 1898	652	3
Suriname	10 January 1903	n/a	n/a
Suriname	8 November 1905	n/a	n/a

The Rhone was built by John Elder of Glasgow, Scotland in 1875 for Gilroy, Sons & Company of Dundee. The Nourse Line bought the ship in 1889 and renamed it the Rhone after the River Rhone. She was primarily used by the Nourse Line for the transportation of Indian indentured labourers to the colonies.

She was also used to repatriate 132 former labourers from St Lucia back to India.

The Rhone was regarded as a fast ship. She made the run from Trinidad to Cape Town in 45 days and on 4 November 1894 travelled to Gravesend from Trinidad in just 24 days.

Her last voyage was eventful, for her captain died while carrying rice from Calcutta to British Guiana. On reaching her destination, she got stuck in the mud and some rice had to be thrown overboard before she could be re-floated. After unloading the remainder of the rice, she sailed for Philadelphia but found five stowaways on board. The captain only managed to disembark the stowaways in the United States after signing a bond and paying for their passage to the West Indies. In Philadelphia she loaded case oil, but the river was frozen and an icebreaker was used to clear a passage and tugs got her to sea. Her troubles were not over as she experienced minor flooding due to a burst pipe and pumps had to be used for 48 hours to clear the water. At the end of this voyage, in 1905, she was sold to Norway and renamed Dybvaag.

== See also ==
- Indian indenture ships to Fiji
- Indians in Fiji
- Indian indenture system
