= Ganges (1861 ship) =

Nourse Line ship

History

United Kingdom
- Name: Ganges
- Owner: Nourse Line
- Builder: William Pile, Sunderland
- Launched: 9 July 1861
- Fate: Wrecked 14 October 1881

General characteristics
- Class & type: Sailing ship
- Tons burthen: 839 tons, later 1161 tons
- Length: 192 ft (59 m)
- Beam: 33.2 ft (10.1 m)
- Draught: 20.6 ft (6.3 m)

Ganges was the first of three Nourse Line ships named for the Ganges river in northern India.

The first Nourse Line ship was the 839-ton sailing ship Ganges built by William Pile of Sunderland and launched on 9 July 1861. Ganges was considered a large vessel for her time and had a figurehead beneath the bowsprit represented Mother Ganges a symbol of fertility. She was the first of many Nourse Line vessels to be named after rivers. Immediately after being built, Ganges sailed to India to commence trading between Calcutta and Australia where James Nourse hired her out to Sandbach, Tinne & Company, who were involved in the transport of sugar, coffee, rum and molasses, and indentured labourers.

As the Nourse Line went into the business of transporting Indian indentured labourers to the West Indies, Ganges made four voyages to Trinidad. On the first, on 9 April 1872, she transported 408 labourers, six of whom died on the voyage. The second trip on 11 May 1874 transported 383 labourers, with five deaths. The third voyage, on 10 February 1876, carried 379 passengers, with three deaths. The fourth, on 5 February 1878, carried 477 passengers, with 14 deaths. She also made a trip to St Lucia and on the return journey in 1867 brought 451 repatriated labourers back to India.

She was a fast ship, covering the distance between British Guiana and Cape Town in 42 days. However, lengthening her by 35 feet (11 m) and increasing her tonnage from 839 to 1161 reduced her speed.

On 14 October 1881, she was wrecked on Goodwin Sands off Kent, en route from Middlesbrough to Calcutta with railway iron. Three people died in the wrecking.

== See also ==
- Ganges (1882)
- SS Ganges
- Indian Indenture Ships to Fiji
- Indian indenture system
