= Moy (ship) =

History

United Kingdom
- Name: Moy
- Owner: Nourse Line
- Builder: Russel & Co
- Launched: May 1885
- Fate: Missing 1905

General characteristics
- Type: Iron-hulled sailing ship
- Tons burthen: 1,697 tons
- Length: 257.6 ft (78.5 m)
- Beam: 38.3 ft (11.7 m)
- Draught: 23.2 ft (7.1 m)

The Moy was a 1,697 ton, iron sailing ship with a length of 257.6 feet (78.5 m), breadth of 38.3 feet (11.7 m) and depth of 23.2 feet (7.1 m). She was built by Russel & Company for the Nourse Line, named after the River Moy in northwest of Ireland and launched in May 1885. She was primarily used for the transportation of Indian indenture labourers to the colonies. Details of some of these voyages are as follows:

Destination	Date of arrival	Number of passengers	Deaths during voyage
Fiji	3 May 1889	677	N/A
Fiji	14 April 1893	467	N/A
Trinidad	11 December 1893	627	N/A
Trinidad	3 December 1894	636	25
Trinidad	16 January 1901	611	3
Fiji	1 June 1898	568	N/A
British Guiana	20 August 1902	N/A	N/A
British Guiana	March 1904	523	46

In 1888, the Moy repatriated 327 former indentured labourers from St Lucia back to India.

During her last voyage, to British Guiana, there was an incredibly high death rate with 46 deaths, and of the remainder 88 had to be sent to hospital in Georgetown. The Surgeon Superintendent's gratuity was withheld for this incident and the captain and third officer also lost part of their pay. In February 1905, on the way back to Liverpool from British Guiana she was reported as missing.

== See also ==
- Indian Indenture Ships to Fiji
- Indian indenture system
