= Sathi Narain =

Fijian politician (1919–1989)

Sir Sathi Narain, KBE (1919 - 19 October 1989) was a Fiji Indian businessman who built a construction and shipping business.

== Family background ==
His parents had arrived in Fiji as indentured labourers abroad on the S.S. Ganges on 21 February 1913 and were sent to work for the Colonial Sugar Refining Company (CSR) estate at Rakui in Navua on the eastern side of the island of Viti Levu. After five years, his parents became "free" and moved to a village outside Navua. They continued working for CSR but under better conditions. They were also able to grow their own cash crops and sell to the indentured labourers.

== Early life ==
Narain was the second child, born during the second year of his parents' life as free labourers in Fiji. His father later found work as a construction worker in Suva, where Narain was also introduced to the tools of the construction trade. After the birth of his third child, Narain's father developed a passion for gambling. He lost all his savings and also owed a great deal of money to others. To get away from his creditors, he decided to return to India, intending to find work there, save enough money and return.

After the departure of his father, his mother gave birth to her fourth child and struggled to look after her children. While on a visit to the Levuka, on the island of Ovalau, she met and married Latchman Naidu and moved to Koro island. Naidu had set up a small business in Koro, buying and selling tobacco and trading in other small goods. Relations between Narain and his stepfather were not always good, so when he was sent to hospital in Levuka for a knee ailment, he stayed on at his recently married sister's place. Narain was ten years old then and started attending the local mission school. Through the wife of the local dentist who had connections with the school, Narain was able to get employment in the surgery. When the dentist moved to Suva, Narain went with them and for two years worked full-time at their home as houseboy and at the surgery.

After two years in Suva his stepfather took him back to Koro, and he was put to work on a European's estate. When the owner was taken ill, Sathi was given charge of the estate. His mother died during the same year aged only 36.

== Return to Suva ==
The recurring knee problem gave Narain the chance to return to Suva for treatment. He found employment as carpenter in the Colonial Government. When his younger brother also came to Suva for medical treatment, the two moved into a house in Toorak, where Narain started building small artifacts for his neighbours. Soon, word of his carpentry skills spread and he was kept busy making household furniture. In no time at all he was carrying out extensions to houses and even building new houses. He married 14-year-old Rukhmani, while in Toorak.

== As a businessman ==
After five years, working for the Government, he decided to set up his own business. He rented a building in Toorak and started building residential buildings and shops. As his business expanded, he moved to a new premises in Walu Bay. His big break came when he won the tender to build the Fiji Museum in 1953. Soon afterwards, he won other major contracts. By this time he had expanded so much that he was able to register his company as a limited liability company in December 1953.

== Savusavu ==
He saw the opportunity and bought a 210-acre (0.85 km^{2}) copra plantation in Savusavu from William Edmund Willoughby-Tottenham, despite opposition from other European planters. As Savusavu expanded, he saw the need for and established a school, named Khemendra Bharatya School, after his son. He also donated land for a park, known as Narain Park.

== Union Club ==
In 1946, Narain joined the Union Club, the only multi-racial club of its type in Suva. There he met some of the then and future leaders of Fiji, including Ratu Sukuna, Ratu Mara and Ratu Edward Cakobau. His fluency in the Fijian language and these initial contacts introduced him to other Fijian leaders such as Ratu Penaia Ganilau and Ratu George Cakobau. At the Union Club he was given the title of Tui Koro (Chief of Koro). In 1955, it came as no surprise when Narain Construction was awarded the contract to build the Native Land Trust Board building in Suva.

== Political involvement ==
In 1956, Narain stood for the Suva City Council elections and won. In 1959 he accepted the nomination as an Indian nominated member to the Legislative Council. In his maiden speech he spoke about ways of assisting low wage earners, by giving them income tax deductions for medical expenses. When the Nausori Sugar Mill closed in 1959, he asked for assistance to be given in the form of income tax deductions for capital expenditure by farmers to change from sugar to other types of cultivation. He proposed assistance to coconut farmers by asking for tax not to be levied on the planting of coconuts but on the proceeds from the sale of copra.

== Expanding business ==
From 1960 onwards the Narain Construction business expanded greatly and spread to all parts of Fiji. He acquired the established engineering firm of Bish Limited in 1960, a branch was opened in Lautoka and he was the first to build town houses in Suva. He won other major contracts: 480 housing units for the Housing Authority, a new hospital in Suva, Travelodge Hotel in Savusavu and the Narain Towers, a fifteen-storey, 72-unit complex in Suva. He even went into the shipping business but was not successful in it.

== Later life ==
His wife had been institutionalised for a long time, and in 1969 Narain remarried. In 1970 on Fiji's independence, he was appointed a Member of the Order of the British Empire (MBE), for which he travelled to London to receive the award from the Queen. In the 1980 Birthday Honours he was promoted to Knight Commander of the Order of the British Empire (KBE) and was knighted by Princess Anne during the Tenth Independence Anniversary celebrations. In 1986, he had moved to Brisbane for rest and to be closer to his children but the coup in Fiji in 1987, made this move permanent. A few years later he was diagnosed with cirrhosis of the lever and died in Brisbane on 19 October 1989.

== Bibliography ==
- Colpani, Satya (1996). Beyond the Black Waters: A Memoir of Sir Sathi Narain. Institute of Pacific Studies. ISBN 982-02-0117-9.
