= Arno (ship) =

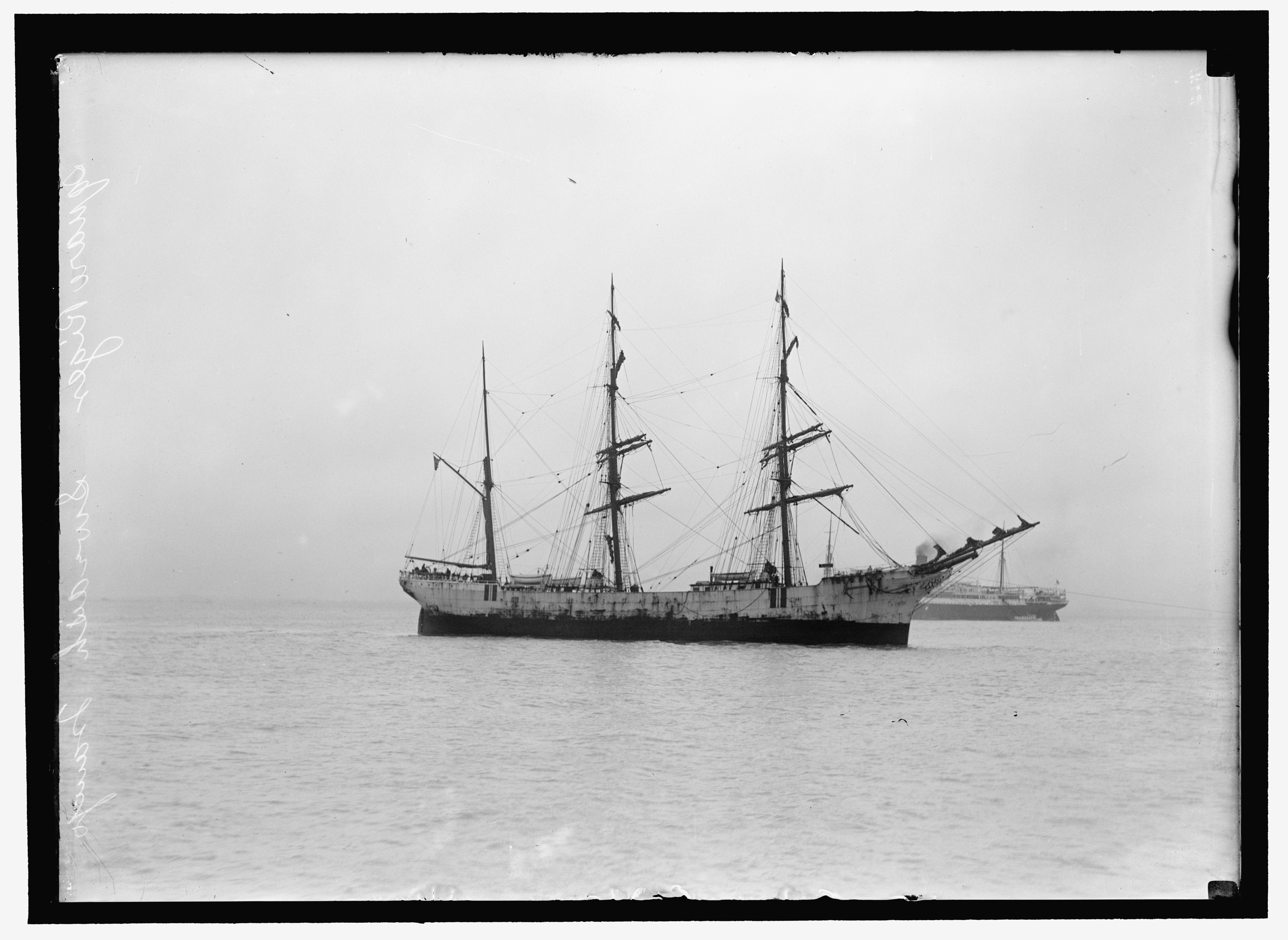

History

United Kingdom
- Name: Arno
- Namesake: Arno River
- Owner: Nourse Line
- Builder: Charles Connell & Company, Glasgow
- Launched: 19 January 1893

History

Norway
- Acquired: 1910
- Fate: Disappeared after 10 October 1913

General characteristics
- Class & type: Iron-hulled sailing ship
- Tons burthen: 1,825 tons
- Length: 270.7 ft (82.5 m)
- Beam: 39 ft (12 m)
- Draught: 22.5 ft (6.9 m)

The Arno, was a 1,825 ton, iron sailing ship with a length of 270.7 feet (82.5 m), breadth of 39 feet (12 m) and depth of 22.5 feet (6.9 m). She was built by Charles Connell & Company, Glasgow, Scotland, for the Nourse Line, named after the Arno River in central Italy, which flows past Florence and Pisa to the Mediterranean Sea, and launched on 19 January 1893. She was primarily used for the transportation of Indian indentured labourers to the colonies. Details of some of these voyages are as follows:

| Destination | Date of Arrival | Number of Passengers | Deaths During Voyage |
|---|---|---|---|
| Fiji | 23 July 1900 | 627 | n/a |
| Trinidad | 15 March 1901 | 656 | 9 |
| Fiji | 4 September 1903 | 634 | n/a |
| Fiji | 3 May 1904 | 631 | n/a |
| Trinidad | 24 November 1906 | 627 | 15 |

In 1896 she was grounded at West Hartlepool, inward bound under tow from Bremen.

Arno was sold to Norwegian owners in 1910. On 10 October 1913 she left Fredrikstad for Pernambuco and was not seen or heard from again.

== See also ==
- Indian Indenture Ships to Fiji
