= Avon (ship) =

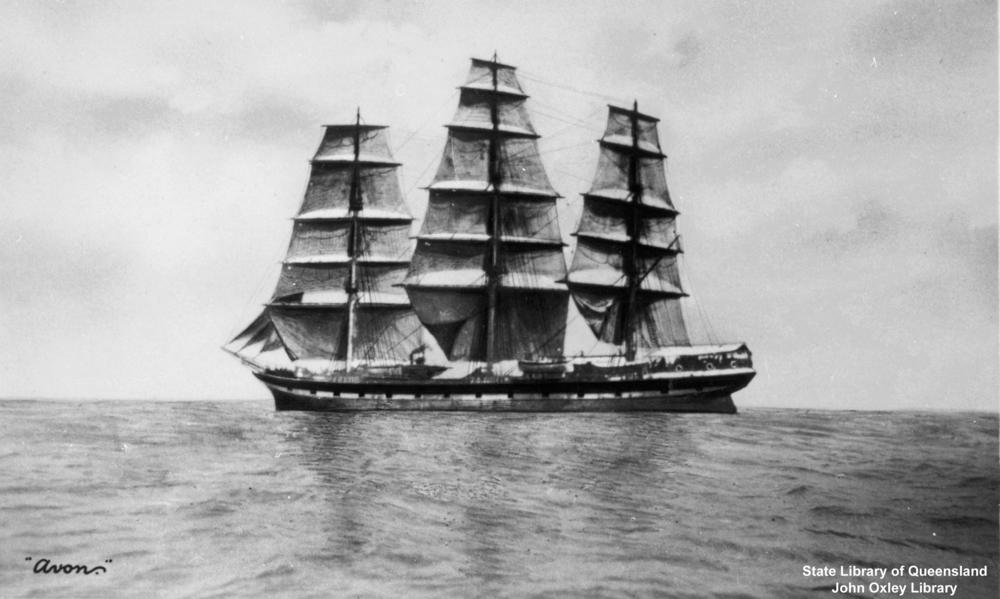

History

United Kingdom
- Name: Dunolly
- Owner: John Brown, Glasgow
- Builder: Charles Connell, Glasgow
- Launched: 17 April 1884
- Acquired: Nourse Line, 1890
- Renamed: Avon, 1890

General characteristics
- Class & type: Iron-hulled sailing ship
- Tons burthen: 1,572 tons
- Length: 255.6 ft (77.9 m)
- Beam: 37.6 ft (11.5 m)
- Draught: 22.6 ft (6.9 m)

The Avon, formerly known as Dunolly, was a 1,572 ton, iron sailing ship with a length of 255.6 feet, breadth of 37.6 feet and depth of 22.6 feet. She was built by Charles Connell of Glasgow in 1884 for John Brown of Glasgow. The Nourse Line bought the ship in 1890 and renamed it the Avon after the River Avon in the south west of England. She was primarily used by the Nourse Line for the transportation of Indian indentured labourers to the colonies. Details of some of these voyages are as follows:

| Destination | Date of arrival | Number of passengers | Deaths during voyage |
|---|---|---|---|
| Trinidad | 1 March 1891 | 558 | 2 |
| Trinidad | 14 November 1891 | 621 | 27 |
| Fiji | 5 May 1892 | 520 | n/a |
| British Guiana | 1893 | n/a | n/a |
| Trinidad | 17 November 1895 | 151 | 2 |
| Trinidad | 12 December 1896 | 601 | 12 |
| Suriname | 4 April 1898 | n/a | n/a |
| Fiji | 25 July 1899 | 467 | n/a |
| Trinidad | 16 February 1901 | 598 | 6 |
| Trinidad | 12 January 1903 | 591 | 2 |
| Trinidad | 25 December 1903 | 576 | 2 |
| Trinidad | 23 February 1905 | 603 | 9 |
| Trinidad | 22 February 1906 | 609 | 1 |
| Suriname | 13 January 1907 | n/a | n/a |

Avon was a fast ship, sailing from Calcutta to St Helena in 62 days.

== See also ==
- Indian Indenture Ships to Fiji

== Bibliography ==
Lubbock, Basil (1981). Coolie ships and oil sailors. Brown, Son & Ferguson. ISBN 0-85174-111-8.
