= List of Indian indenture ships to Fiji =

Between 1879 and 1916, a total of 42 ships made 87 voyages, carrying Indian indentured labourers to Fiji. Initially the ships brought labourers from Calcutta, but from 1903 all ships except two also brought labourers from Madras and Mumbai. A total of 60,965 passengers left India but only 60,553 (including births at sea) arrived in Fiji. A total of 45,439 boarded ships in Calcutta and 15,114 in Madras. Sailing ships took, on average, seventy-three days for the trip while steamers took 30 days. The shipping companies associated with the labour trade were Nourse Line and British-India Steam Navigation Company.

The most important man on these ships was the Surgeon-Superintendent, who supervised the medical care, ventilation, clothing, cleanliness and exercise of the passengers and his authority extended over the Captain. He inspected the stores before departure and reported on any defects during the trip. The Surgeon-Superintendent also intervened to prevent passengers from being mistreated by the crew. He was paid a bonus for each labourer landed alive.

== List of ships ==
The table below provides details of the 87 voyages made by the 40 ships that brought Indian Indentured Labourers to Fiji. Of these ships, 27 were sailing ships and 13 were steam ships.

Name of ship	Date of arrival	Registered numbers	Number of arrivals
Leonidas	14 May 1879	1–463	463
Berar	29 June 1882	464–887	424
Poonah	17 September 1882	888–1364	477
Poonah	19 June 1883	1365–1860	496
Bayard	20 August 1883	1861–2354	494
Syria	14 May 1884	2355–2792	438
Howrah	26 June 1884	2793–3287	495
Pericles	3 July 1884	3288–3748	461
SS Newnham	23 July 1884	3749–4323	575
Main	30 April 1885	4324–5048	725
Ganges	27 June 1885	5049–5571	523
Boyne	26 April 1886	5572–6108	537
Bruce	21 May 1886	6109–6566	458
Hereford	24 April 1888	6567–7105	539
Moy	3 May 1889	7106–7782	677
Rhone	15 May 1890	7783–8367	585
Allanshaw	17 June 1890	8368–8940	573
Danube	15 June 1891	8941–9531	591
Jumna	27 June 1891	9532–9978	447
British Peer	23 April 1892	9979–10505	527
Avon	5 May 1892	10506–11025	520
Hereford	15 June 1892	11026–11504	479
Moy	14 April 1893	11505–11971	467
Jumna	23 May 1893	11972–12281	310
Ems	20 April 1894	12282–12851	570
Hereford	28 June 1894	12852–13362	511
SS Vadala	26 March 1895	13363–14109	747
SS Virawa	26 April 1895	14110–14786	677
Erne	24 April 1896	14787–15343	557
Elbe	13 June 1896	15344–15958	615
Rhone	11 May 1897	15959–16611	653
Clyde	1 June 1897	16612–17281	670
Moy	1 June 1898	17282–17849	568
Avon	25 July 1899	17850–18316	467
Ganges	3 September 1899	18317–18780	464
Ganges	21 June 1900	18781–19334	554
Elbe	26 July 1900	19335–19938	604
Arno	23 July 1900	19939–20565	627
Rhine	30 August 1900	20566–21056	491
SS Fazilka	28 March 1901	21057–21860	804
SS Fultala	12 May 1901	21861–22669	809
SS Fazilka	18 June 1901	22670–23445	776
SS Virawa	26 April 1902	23446–24163	718
SS Fazilka	20 June 1902	24164–25003	840
Mersey	13 June 1903	25004–25588	585
Elbe	5 August 1903	25589–26178	590
Arno	4 September 1903	26179–26812	634
Arno	3 May 1904	26813–27443	631
Ems	30 July 1904	27444–27969	526
SS Fultala	10 April 1905	27970–28796	827
SS Virawa	17 July 1905	28797–29411	615
SS Wardha	28 July 1905	29412–30303	892
SS Fultala	17 August 1905	30304–31093	790
SS Fazilka	17 April 1906	31094–31974	881
SS Fultala	28 April 1906	31975–32775	801
SS Wardha	28 June 1906	32776–33609	834
SS Fazilka	28 January 1907	33610–34484	875
SS Virawa	23 March 1907	34485–35243	759
SS Fazilka	25 April 1907	35244–36039	796
SS Sangola	18 March 1908	36040–37171	1132
SS Sangola	6 June 1908	37172–38257	1086
SS Sangola	1 February 1909	38258–39409	1152
SS Sangola	21 April 1909	39410–40076	667
SS Sangola	7 March 1910	40077–41002	926
SS Santhia	22 April 1910	41003–42023	1021
SS Sangola	5 June 1910	42024–42892	869
SS Santhia	8 July 1910	42893–43922	1030
SS Mutlah	22 May 1911	43923–44756	834
SS Sutlej	25 June 1911	44757–45606	850
SS Ganges	22 July 1911	45607–46466	860
SS Mutlah	18 August 1911	46467–47329	863
SS Sutlej	4 October 1911	47330–48140	811
SS Sutlej	27 April 1912	48141–48997	857
SS Indus	8 June 1912	48998–49801	804
SS Ganges	18 July 1912	49802–50644	843
SS Ganges	8 November 1912	50645–51490	846
SS Ganges	21 February 1913	51491–52261	771
SS Sutlej	11 April 1913	52262–53069	808
SS Ganges	29 May 1913	53070–53917	848
SS Ganges	9 September 1913	53918–54701	784
SS Chenab	24 March 1914	54702–55556	855
SS Chenab	16 June 1914	55557–56273	717
SS Mutlah	7 May 1915	56274–57125	852
SS Ganges	21 June 1915	57126–57971	846
SS Mutlah	1 August 1915	57972–58783	812
SS Chenab	1 September 1916	58784–59665	882
SS Sutlej	11 November 1916	59666–60553	888

=== Notes ===
- The number following the name of the ship denotes the voyage number (to Fiji).
- "SS" in front of the name of the ship denotes that it was a steam ship.
- From 1905 all ships were steam ships.

== See also ==
- Colonial Sugar Refining Company (Fiji)
- Indian indenture system
- Repatriation of indentured Indians from Fiji
- Sugar industry in Fiji
