= Hereford (ship) =

1456-ton iron sailing ship

Coordinates: 35.3307°N 75.4079°W

History

United Kingdom
- Name: Hereford
- Owner: Merchant Shipping Company, London
- Builder: J. Elder & Company, Glasgow
- Launched: 1869
- Acquired: Chartered by the New Zealand Shipping Company in the 1870s; purchased by Nourse Line, 1882

History

Norway
- Acquired: 1898
- Fate: Wrecked 1 April 1907

General characteristics
- Class & type: Iron-hulled sailing ship
- Tons burthen: 1,456 tons

Hereford was a 1456-ton iron sailing ship with two decks and one cemented bulkhead which was built in 1869 by J. Elder & Company at Glasgow for the Merchant Shipping Company of London. She was chartered by the New Zealand Shipping Company in the 1870s and made three voyages to Lyttelton, New Zealand, with approximately three hundred emigrants each time. The first voyage in 1874 took 87 days, and the second took 80 days, arriving in Lyttelton on 19 January 1878. In January 1881, she became stranded on a reef near Point Addis, in Victoria, Australia, but was towed off by a steam tug a month later.

In 1882, the Hereford was purchased by the Nourse Line. In 1883, she made a voyage to Townsville, Australia from Plymouth, England, in 101 days, with 451 passengers, including 1 Fare paying, 113 Assisted and 337 Free. She left Townsville for Calcutta from where she picked up Indian indentured labourers for Guyana and brought sugar back to England.

The Hereford made three voyages to Trinidad carrying Indian indentured labourers. On the first voyage, she arrived in on 31 October 1888 carrying 601 passengers. There were 13 deaths during the voyage. She then arrived on 5 February 1890 with 598 passengers (6 deaths) and later on 27 December 1894 with 565 passengers (37 deaths).

The Hereford was used for the transportation of Indian indentured labourers to Suriname as well, making four voyages on 17 May 1891, 19 April 1893, 11 November 1895, and 17 December 1896. She was also involved in the repatriation of labourers from St Lucia back to India in 1890.

She made three voyages to Fiji, the first on 24 April 1888 carrying 539 Indian indentured labourers, the second on 15 June 1892 carrying 479 labourers, and the third on 28 June 1894 carrying 511 labourers.

The Hereford was sold to Norwegian owners in 1898 and on 1 April 1907 was wrecked at Hatteras Island, North Carolina, en route from Pensacola, Florida, to Buenos Aires, Argentina, with the loss of three of her crew. Survivors were rescued by the steamship Olivebank.

== See also ==
- Indian Indenture Ships to Fiji
- Indians in Fiji
- Indian indenture system
