= Ganges (1882 ship) =

Nourse Line ship

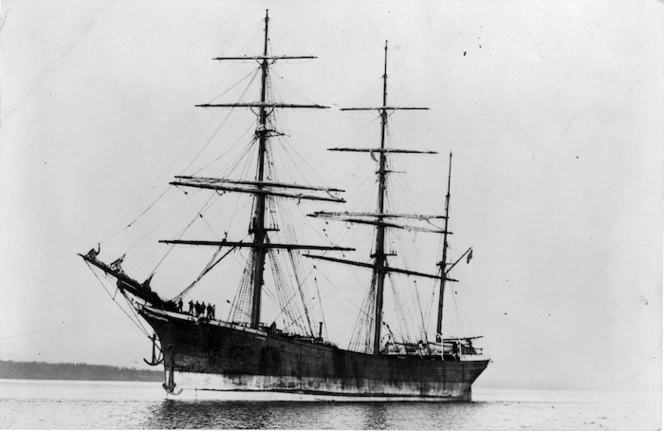
- The ship Ganges

History

United Kingdom
- Name: Ganges
- Owner: Nourse Line
- Builder: Osbourne, Graham & Company, Sunderland
- Launched: 25 March 1882

Norway
- Acquired: 1904
- Renamed: Asters
- Fate: Sunk, 28 May 1917

General characteristics
- Class & type: Iron barque
- Tons burthen: 1,768 tons
- Length: 241 ft (73 m)
- Beam: 37.2 ft (11.3 m)
- Draught: 22.5 ft (6.9 m)

Ganges was the second Nourse Line ship to be named Ganges. The first Ganges was built in 1861 and wrecked in 1881. Ganges was a 1,529-ton iron barque, built by Osbourne, Graham & Company of Sunderland and launched on 25 March 1882. She was 241 feet (73 m) long, with a beam of 37.2 feet (11.3 m) and a draught of 22.5 feet (6.9 m).

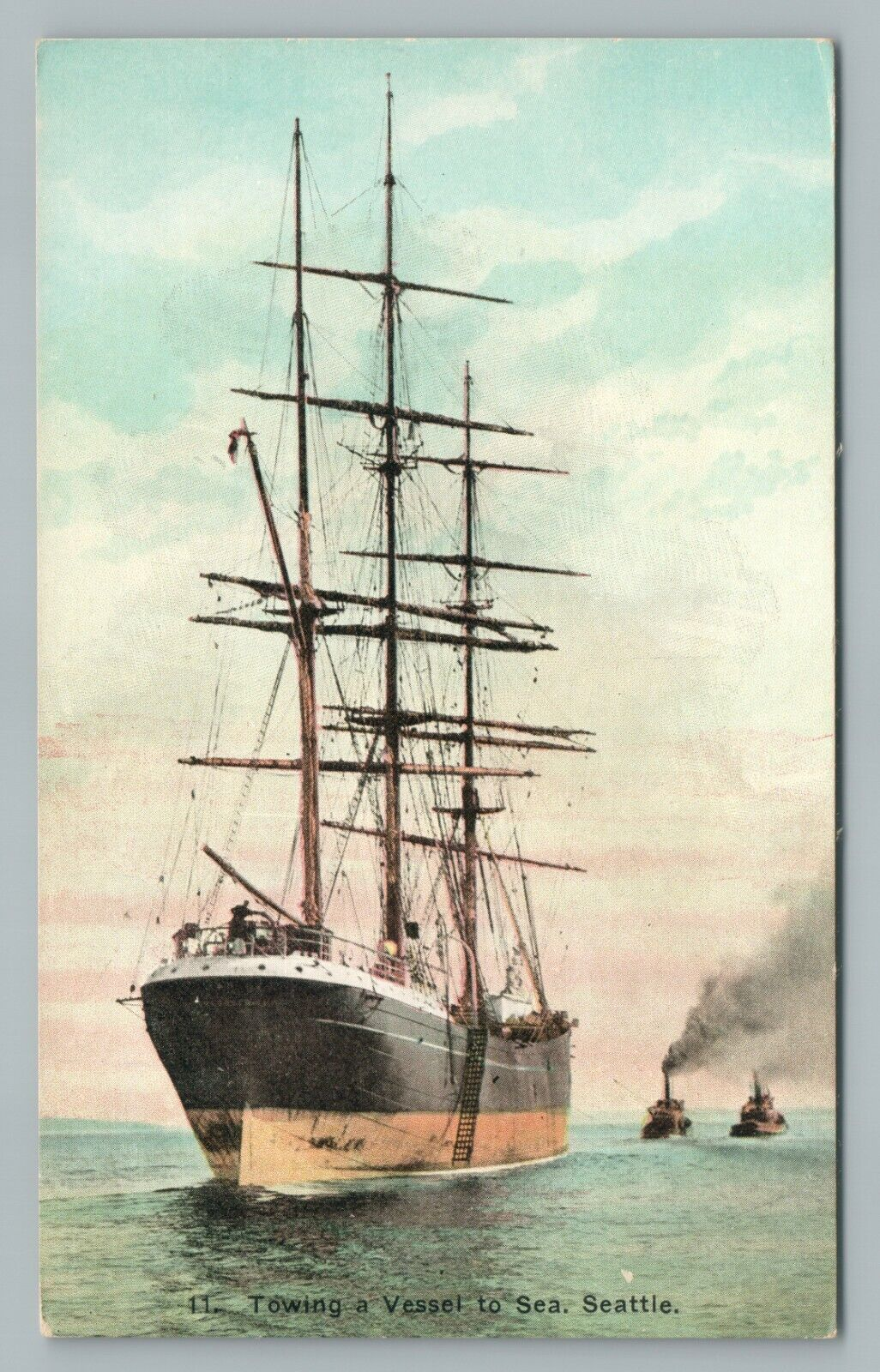
Towing a vessel to Sea. A postcard from a photo, taken in 1906 by Webster & Stevens photographer Homer Davidson, the lumber freighter "Ganges" was headed to pick up a load of lumber at Port Blakely. Its crew then signed on at Port Townsend, and the ship sailed to Callao, Peru to deliver the lumber.

Ganges made three trips to Fiji, the first on 27 June 1885 carrying 523 Indian indentured labourers. She arrived next on 3 September 1899, carrying 464 Indian indentured labourers and finally on 21 June 1900, carrying 554 passengers. She also made voyages to the West Indies, arriving in Trinidad on 25 November 1890 carrying 568 passengers and arriving in Suriname on 23 April 1889.

She was sold to Norwegian owners in 1904 and renamed Asters. During World War I, she was torpedoed and sunk in the Atlantic Ocean on 28 May 1917 by the Imperial German Navy submarine SM UC-55 150 miles (240 km) northwest of the Isles of Scilly while on a voyage from Le Havre, France, to Philadelphia, Pennsylvania, with a cargo of oil and wax. All on board Asters survived.

== See also ==
- SS Ganges
- Indian Indenture Ships to Fiji
- Indian indenture system
