= Ems (ship) =

Commercial sailing ship (1893–1927)

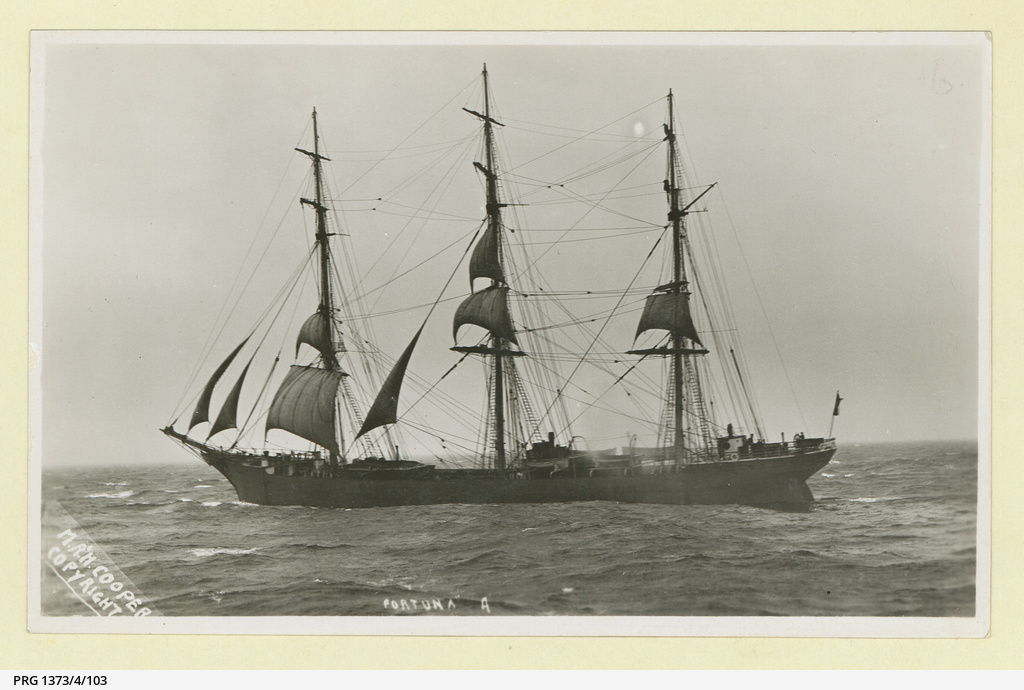
- The Ems as Fortuna under sail

History

United Kingdom
- Name: Ems
- Namesake: Ems (river)
- Owner: Nourse Line
- Builder: Charles Connell & Company, Glasgow
- Launched: 6 April 1893

History

Norway
- Owner: Tønsberg Whaling Company, 1910; resold in 1912 to another Norwegian owner, refitted as whaling and guano ship

History

Argentina
- Owner: Argentine Whaling Company
- Acquired: 1916
- Renamed: Fortuna
- Fate: Fire and abandoned 28 October 1927

General characteristics
- Class & type: Iron-hulled sailing ship
- Tons burthen: 1,829 tons
- Length: 270.7 ft (82.5 m)
- Beam: 39 ft (12 m)
- Draught: 22.5 ft (6.9 m)

The Ems was a 1,829 ton, iron sailing ship with a length of 270.7 feet (82.5 m), breadth of 39 feet (12 m) and depth of 22.5 feet (6.9 m).

== History ==
She was built by Charles Connell & Company, Glasgow for the Nourse Line, and named after the Ems River in north west Germany, and launched on 6 April 1893. She was primarily used for the transportation of Indian indentured labourers to the colonies. Details of some of these voyages are as follows:

Destination	Date of Arrival	Number of Passengers	Deaths During Voyage
Fiji	20 April 1894	570	n/a
Suriname	22 November 1894	n/a	n/a
Fiji	30 July 1904	526	n/a

In 1898, she made a voyage from Bristol to Calcutta in 87 days and in 1902 arrived in Calcutta from New York in 102 days.

In 1910, the Ems was sold to Tønsberg Whaling Company of Norway. She was resold in 1912 to another Norwegian owner and refitted as a whaling and guano ship.

In 1916 she was sold to the Argentine Whaling Company, was renamed the Fortuna but kept her Norwegian crew. On 28 October 1927, she caught fire, 20 miles (32 km) off the Irish coast while on a voyage from Liverpool to South Georgia with coal and empty oil drums. She was abandoned at sea with the loss of five lives.

== See also ==
- Indian Indenture Ships to Fiji
