= Elbe (1887 ship) =

Indian indenture ship

History

United Kingdom
- Name: Elbe
- Owner: Nourse Line
- Builder: Russel & Co
- Launched: July 1887
- Fate: Sold, December 1907

General characteristics
- Type: Iron-hulled sailing ship
- Tons burthen: 1,693 tons
- Length: 257 ft (78 m)
- Beam: 38.2 ft (11.6 m)
- Draught: 23.1 ft (7.0 m)
- Sail plan: Three masts

Elbe, was a 1,693 ton, three-masted, iron sailing ship with a length of 257 feet, breadth of 38.2 feet and depth of 23.1 feet.

== History ==
She was built by Russel & Company in Glasgow for the Nourse Line, named after the River Elbe the longest river in Germany and launched in July 1887. She was primarily used for the transportation of Indian indentured labourers to the colonies. Details of some of these voyages are as follows:

Destination	Date of arrival	Number of passengers	Deaths during voyage
Suriname	23 November 1889	n/a	n/a
Fiji	13 June 1896	615	n/a
Trinidad	12 November 1897	545	5
Fiji	26 July 1900	604	n/a
Trinidad	17 December 1901	613	3
Fiji	5 August 1903	590	n/a
Trinidad	19 October 1906	597	0

Elbe's third trip to Fiji was historic because it brought the first labourers from Madras to Fiji for the first time. Most South Indians were Tamil speakers but other languages such as Telugu and Malayalam were also represented. Conditions on board were good for the time, with regular nutritious food, plenty of exercise and an on-board hospital, and as a result there was a mortality of less than one percent.

Elbe was the ship that brought the former President of Guyana, Cheddi Jagan's, parents and grandmothers to British Guiana from British India.

Elbe was also used for the transportation of cargo, arriving in London from Sydney, in March 1896 with a cargo of wool. The journey took 75 days.

Elbe was sold in December 1907.

== See also ==
- Indian indenture ships to Fiji
