= Erne (ship) =

History

United Kingdom
- Name: Erne
- Owner: Nourse Line
- Builder: Russel & Co
- Launched: 6 May 1886

History

Canada
- Owner: River Plate Shipping Co, Montreal
- Acquired: 1908
- Fate: Abandoned in the North Atlantic 8 February 1912

History

United Kingdom
- Owner: Erne Shipping Co.
- Acquired: 1909

General characteristics
- Class & type: Iron-hulled sailing ship
- Tons burthen: 1,692 tons
- Length: 255.6 ft (77.9 m)
- Beam: 38.3 ft (11.7 m)
- Draught: 23.2 ft (7.1 m)

The Erne was a fully rigged sailing ship built in the late 19th century. The details surrounding the ship's abandonment and wreck have been debated off-and-on for over one hundred years.

== Early career ==
The Erne was built as a 1,692 ton, iron sailing ship with a length of 255.6 feet (77.9 m), breadth of 38.3 feet (11.7 m) and depth of 23.2 feet (7.1 m). She was built by Russel & Company for the Nourse Line, named after the River Erne in northwest of Ireland, and launched in May 1886. She was primarily used for the transportation of Indian indentured labourers to the colonies. Details of some of these voyages are as follows:

Destination	Date of Arrival	Number of Passengers	Deaths During Voyage
Suriname	27 April 1890	n/a	n/a
Suriname	14 April 1894	n/a	n/a
Fiji	24 April 1896	557	n/a
Suriname	27 April 1899	n/a	n/a
British Guiana	1906	n/a	n/a

In 1895, the Erne took 22 days to travel from Barbados to Liverpool.

== Storm at Sea ==
On either 1 February or 26 January, 1912 the ship left Boston with a destination of Argentina. On 3 February a storm struck and the ship was cracked nearly in half, separating those at the bow from those at the stern. The damage was so heavy that the only thing keeping the ship from sinking was its hold filled with buoyant lumber.

On 8 February nine survivors were rescued by a passing liner. Ten others were missing, including the captain and his wife (the Ficketts), the second mate (Frank Cushing), and a passenger (Robert Hay.) The story told by the survivors, with few details, was that six crewman were washed overboard by a wave and that the Ficketts, Cushing, and Hay abandoned ship in the only remaining lifeboat. After the rescue, the Erne could not be tracked down for inspection and was last seen floating upside down near Sable Island.

=== Theories ===
While the survivors indicated that Mrs. Fickett had been injured by a wave and the three men with her then launched the lifeboat in order to abandon ship, sailing experts at the time indicated that not only did that not match Captain Fickett's reputation, but that it would have been physically unlikely that the three men could have performed the launch by themselves or with the injured woman.

In the aftermath of the disaster multiple witnesses came forward stating that not only was there a feud between the captain and First Mate James Elliott that had led to the captain slapping Elliott, but that Elliott had been heard on more than one occasion claiming that he would get even with Fickett. The belief that a murderous mutiny led to the disappearance of the four "was almost universally agreed upon by New England seafaring men."

While another theory presented is that the lifeboat, the Ficketts, Cushing, and Hay were merely washed overboard with the other six victims, this contradicts the story presented by the survivors without giving any explanation as to why they would lie about a situation wherein they would not have been culpable.

== See also ==
- Indian Indenture Ships to Fiji
