= Poonah (ship) =

History

United Kingdom
- Name: Poonah
- Owner: Tyser & Haviside
- Builder: William Pile, Sunderland
- Launched: 1867
- Renamed: Lief. Drammen

General characteristics
- Tons burthen: 1199 tons

Poonah, named after the city of Poonah in western India, was a three-masted sailing ship of 1199 tons, owned by Tyser & Haviside and was built in 1867 by William Pile at Sunderland.

== Trips to West Indies ==
She was used as an indenture ship in the West Indies, carrying 306 passengers to St. Lucia in 1885 and 387 passengers to Trinidad on 22 February 1869, of whom 5 died.

== Trips to Fiji ==
The Poonah made two trips from India to Fiji. Its first arrival at Suva was on 17 September 1882 with 476 passengers on board, and the second was on 18 June 1883, with 515 passengers. During the first trip, the Lascar crew refused to go on deck during a severe storm and the ship was almost lost, and during the second trip there was an outbreak of cholera and smallpox. There were 26 deaths during the trip from cholera and another death of one of the passengers in Fiji.

== Trips to South Africa ==
The Poonah made trips from India to South Africa carrying indentured labourers who ended up working on the sugar cane plantations, in the hotels and as merchants in Durban, Tongaat, Stanger and in many other parts of South Africa. The Poonah left Calcutta in early 1878 with a full complement of indentured Indian labourers and crew on board and she docked in Durban harbour in July 1878.

== Change of ownership ==
She was later sold and renamed 'Lief'.

== See also ==
- Indian Indenture Ships to Fiji
- Indian indenture system
- Indians in Fiji
