= SS Sangola =

Merchant steamship built in the UK in 1901

History
- Name: 1901: Sangola; 1923: Goshu Maru
- Owner: 1901: British India SN Co; 1923: Fukuhara Kisen KK
- Port of registry: 1901: (United Kingdom of Great Britain and Ireland) Glasgow; 1923: (Empire of Japan) Dairen
- Builder: William Denny & Bros, Dumbarton
- Cost: £89,420
- Yard number: 647
- Launched: 18 June 1901
- Completed: 16 August 1901
- Identification: UK official number 113974; 1901: code letters SNCG; 1923: code letters QBSN
- Fate: Scrapped 1933

General characteristics
- Class & type: "S" class cargo liner
- Tonnage: 5,149 GRT, 3,323 NRT, 8,122 DWT
- Length: 410.8 ft (125.2 m)
- Beam: 50.7 ft (15.5 m)
- Draught: 25 ft 1 in (7.65 m)
- Depth: 29.1 ft (8.9 m)
- Decks: 2
- Installed power: 383 NHP, 2,329 ihp
- Propulsion: 1 × triple-expansion engine; 1 × screw
- Speed: 11 1/2 knots (21.3 km/h)
- Capacity: cargo: 381,390 cubic feet (10,800 m^{3}); passengers: 6 × 1st class, 16 × 2nd class, & large number of deck class
- Crew: 94

SS Sangola was a steam cargo liner that was launched in Scotland in 1901, renamed Goshu Maru in 1923, and scrapped in Japan in 1933. She was one of a class of seven steamships that were built for the British India Steam Navigation Company (BI) in 1901 and 1902. From 1908 until 1910 she took Indian indentured labourers to Fiji.

She was the first of two BI ships to be called Sangola. The second was a motor ship that was launched in 1947 and scrapped in 1963.

== "S" class cargo liners ==
In 1901 and 1902 BI took delivery of a class of seven new cargo liners. BI gave each ship a name beginning with "S", so they became known as the "S" class.

William Denny and Brothers of Dumbarton in Scotland, with whom BI had a preferential business relationship, built four of the ships. A. & J. Inglis of Glasgow built one. Sir James Laing & Sons of Sunderland in England built two. Denny launched Sangola, Santhia and Satara in 1901, and Surada in 1902. Inglis launched Shirala in 1901. Laing launched Sealda in 1901 and Sofala in 1902.

Satara was wrecked in 1910. U-boats sank Shirala and Surada in 1918. In 1923 BI sold the remaining four ships to buyers in Asia. A buyer in Bombay sold Sealda to a Hong Kong shipowner. She was scrapped in Italy in 1925. Japanese shipowners bought Sangola, Santhia, and Sofala and renamed them. They were scrapped in Japan between 1933 and 1935.

== Building ==
Denny built Sangola as yard number 647 for £89,420. She was launched on 18 June 1901 and completed on 16 August. Her registered length was 410.8 ft (125.2 m), her beam was 50.7 ft (15.5 m), her depth was 29.1 ft (8.9 m) and her draught was 25 ft 1 in (7.65 m). Her tonnages were 5,149 GRT, 3,323 NRT, and 8,122 DWT.

Her holds had capacity for 381,390 cubic feet (10,800 m^{3}) of cargo. She had berths for six passengers in first class and 16 in second class. She also had space for large number of unberthed deck class passengers.

She had a single screw, driven by a three-cylinder triple-expansion engine built by Denny. It was rated at 383 NHP or 2,329 ihp, and gave her a speed of 11 1/2 knots (21.3 km/h).

== Sangola ==
BI registered Sangola at Glasgow. Her United Kingdom official number was 113974 and her code letters were SNCG.

On 23 March 1908 Sangola was anchored in Suva Harbour in Fiji. She had disembarked a party of Indian indentured labourers, and was discharging her cargo into lighters, when a cyclone swept her and the lighters ashore. She was refloated undamaged.

From 1908 to 1910 Sangola made six voyages to Fiji, bringing Indian indentured labourers from Calcutta and Madras (now Chennai), as shown in the table below.

Fiji voyages
| Voyage Number | Date of Arrival | Number of Passengers |
|---|---|---|
| I | 18 March 1908 | 1132 |
| II | 6 June 1908 | 1086 |
| III | 1 February 1909 | 1152 |
| IV | 21 April 1909 | 667 |
| V | 7 March 1910 | 926 |
| VI | 5 June 1910 | 869 |

In 1914 Sangola was briefly requisitioned as a troop ship. She carried part of an Indian Expeditionary Force, which reached Marseille that September.

From May 1917 until March 1919, Sangola came under the Liner Requisition Scheme. That September she grounded at Fulta Point in the Hooghly River while inbound to Calcutta. She was refloated undamaged.

== Goshu Maru ==
In June 1923 Fukuhara Kisen KK bought Sangola for £13,500. She was delivered to Japan on 18 August. She was renamed Goshu Maru and registered at Dairen in the Kwantung Leased Territory. Her code letters were QBSN. She was scrapped in Japan in the last quarter of 1933.

== See also ==
- List of Indian indenture ships to Fiji

== Bibliography ==
- Haws, Duncan (1987). British India S.N. Co. Merchant Fleets. Vol. 11. Burwash: Travel Creatours Ltd Publications. ISBN 0-946378-07-X.
- Lloyd's Register of British and Foreign Shipping. Vol. I.–Steamers. London: Lloyd's Register of Shipping. 1902 – via Internet Archive.
- Lloyd's Register of Shipping. Vol. I.–Steamers and Motorships. London: Lloyd's Register of Shipping. 1924 – via Internet Archive.
- Mercantile Navy List. London. 1902 – via Crew List Index Project.
