= SS Indus (1904) =

Steamboat

History
- Owner: Nourse Line
- Builder: Charles Connell & Company Limited
- Launched: 28 April 1904
- Completed: May 1904
- Fate: Sunk 10 September 1914

General characteristics
- Type: steamship
- Tonnage: 3,393 tons
- Installed power: Triple expansion steam 425 hp (317 kW)
- Propulsion: Single screw,

SS Indus was a 3,393-ton steamship launched on 28 April 1904. Delivered to the Nourse Line in May 1904, she was the shipping company's first steamship. She was built by Charles Connell & Company Limited, Glasgow and had single screw, triple expansion, 425 nhp engines.

== Voyages ==
Like other Nourse Line ships, she was primarily used for the transportation of Indian indentured labourers to the colonies. Details of some of these voyages are as follows:

Destination	Date of Arrival	Number of Passengers	Deaths During Voyage
Trinidad	13 November 1904	634	2
Trinidad	15 January 1906	694	4
Trinidad	13 December 1906	740	17
Suriname	3 July 1907	n/a	n/a
Suriname	4 November 1907	n/a	n/a
Trinidad	12 August 1908	815	8
Suriname	5 December 1908	n/a	n/a
Trinidad	27 July 1909	812	5
Trinidad	12 August 1908	815	8
British Guiana	1910	n/a	n/a
Trinidad	8 October 1911	402	1
British Guiana	1912	n/a	n/a
Trinidad	13 February 1912	352	2
Fiji	8 June 1912	804	n/a
Trinidad	12 September 1912	404	2
Trinidad	8 January 1913	326	2
Suriname	4 June 1914	n/a	n/a

== Sinking ==
Indus was captured by SMS Emden on 10 September 1914, bound from Calcutta to Bombay for use as an Indian Expeditionary Force transport. Emden sank her by scuttling and gunfire at position 11°00′N 83°45′E after having taken aboard all her complement. Her crew were later transferred to the German collier Markomania.

== See also ==
- Indian Indenture Ships to Fiji
- Indian indenture system
