= SS Virawa =

British-built merchant ship

History

United Kingdom
- Name: Virawa
- Owner: British India SN Co
- Port of registry: Glasgow
- Builder: Wm Denny & Bros, Dumbarton
- Cost: £59,600
- Yard number: 441
- Launched: 15 September 1890
- Completed: 5 November 1890
- Identification: UK official number 98587; code letters LWKR
- Fate: scrapped, 1921

General characteristics
- Type: cargo ship
- Tonnage: 3,333 GRT, 2,158 NRT, 4,933 DWT
- Length: 340.0 ft (103.6 m)
- Beam: 43.1 ft (13.1 m)
- Draught: 23 ft 1 in (7.0 m)
- Depth: 26.0 ft (7.9 m)
- Decks: 3
- Installed power: 320 NHP, 1,628 ihp
- Propulsion: 1 × quadruple-expansion engine; 1 × screw
- Speed: 11 knots (20 km/h)
- Capacity: 8 × 1st class passengers
- Crew: 54
- Notes: sister ship: Vadala

SS Virawa was British India Steam Navigation Company (BI) steamship. She was launched in Scotland in 1890 and scrapped in India in 1921. Her trades included taking horses from Australia to India, and indentured labourers from India to Fiji and Trinidad. In 1899 she was a troop ship in the Second Boer War.

== Building ==
In 1890 William Denny and Brothers of Dumbarton on the River Leven built a pair of sister ships for BI for £59,600 each. Yard number 440 was launched on 4 August as Vadala and completed on 13 September. Yard number 441 was launched on 15 September as Virawa and completed on 5 November.

Virawa's registered length was 340.0 ft (103.6 m), her beam was 43.1 ft (13.1 m) and her depth was 26.0 ft (7.9 m). Her tonnages were 3,333 GRT, 2,158 NRT, and 4,933 DWT. She had berths for 8 first class passengers.

Virawa had a single screw, driven by a quadruple-expansion steam engine. It was rated at 320 NHP and gave her a speed of 11 knots (20 km/h). She was an early example of a BI ship with telemotor steering gear.

== Early years ==
BI registered Virawa at Glasgow. Her United Kingdom official number was 98587 and her code letters were LWKR.

In August 1891 a large number of horses was exported from Australia to India in the BI ships Bhundara and Virawa, and Australasian United Steam Navigation Company (AUSN Co) ships Bulimba and Waroonga. BI had a controlling interest in the AUSN Co. On 31 August Virawa left Melbourne for Calcutta carrying 530 horses: the largest number yet exported from Australia aboard one steamship.

On 11 September Virawa grounded on Dugdale Reef near Thursday Island in the Torres Strait. A steamship called Victoria tried to tow her off, but was unsuccessful. On 14 September the BI ship Jelunga succeeded in towing Virawa off the reef. Virawa was undamaged, and continued her journey to India.

== Indian indentured labourers ==
Between 1895 and 1907 Virawa made four voyages taking Indian indentured labourers abroad, as shown in the table below. On her 1895 voyage she left Calcutta carrying either 683 or 687 labourers (accounts differ), and sailed via the Torres Strait. Three days later, measles broke out aboard. Two of her passengers died. When she reached Suva on 26 April, her passengers were quarantined on Nukulau. The ship was also quarantined and fumigated. Nine people died on her voyage to Trinidad in 1901.

Fiji and Trinidad voyages
Destination	Date of Arrival	Number of Passengers
Fiji	26 April 1895	677
Trinidad	17 October 1901	734
Fiji	17 July 1905	615
Fiji	23 March 1907	759

== Collision with Bessie Maud ==
In October 1898 Virawa was again in Australia loading horses for India. She loaded 257 horses at Melbourne, and then went to Newcastle, New South Wales to load another 149 horses and a cargo of coal. The horses were destined for Calcutta as army remounts. Bhundarra was in Newcastle at the same time, to load 300 horses for Bombay (now Mumbai).

On the morning of 4 October Virawa arrived off Newcastle and took on a pilot, who took her into port on the flood tide. At 0645 hrs she was reaching the end of the breakwater when a schooner, the 63 GRT Bessie Maud, carrying a cargo of timber, crossed her bow. Virawa put her engine full astern and dropped her port anchor. This slowed the steamship, but did not stop her from hitting the schooner's starboard side. Virawa then dropped her starboard anchor in error, striking Bessie Maud's deckhouse. The steamship then raised the starboard anchor, which broke off the schooner's mainmast. The two ships drifted together for a while, and the schooner's crew climbed to safety aboard the steamship. Then Bessie Maud fell clear and sank in only 22 feet (7 m) of water, forming a danger to navigation. Virawa continued to Queen's Wharf, where she berthed.

The Marine Board in Newcastle opened an inquiry on 5 October, heard evidence, and adjourned. On 12 October the Board met again, and delivered its decision that Captain Edward Anderson had navigated Bessie Maud on a course contrary to harbour regulations, and so bore sole blame for the collision. On 17 October the Board met again, and suspended Anderson's certificate for three months.

== Later years ==
All BI ships were designed to be converted into troop ships, by putting troop accommodation in the holds. In the Second Boer War the UK Government chartered at least 37 BI ships for war service. On 8 October 1899 Virawa left Bombay carrying part of the 5th Dragoon Guards. She arrived in Durban on 25 October.

In July 1901 Virawa was in the Bay of Bengal when her main engine failed. City Line's City of Athens towed her into port. In August 1905 she grounded on Tobin Cay in the Great Northeast Channel. She was refloated with little damage.

By 1919 Virawa was equipped with wireless telegraphy. On 12 May 1921 BI sold her for scrap for 82,000 rupees. She was broken up in Bombay.

== See also ==
- List of Indian indenture ships to Fiji

== Bibliography ==
- Haws, Duncan (1987). British India S.N. Co. Merchant Fleets. Vol. 11. Burwash: Travel Creatours Ltd Publications. ISBN 0-946378-07-X.
- Lloyd's Register of British and Foreign Shipping. Vol. I.–Steamers. London: Lloyd's Register of Shipping. 1891 – via Internet Archive.
- Lloyd's Register of Shipping. Vol. II.–Steamers. London: Lloyd's Register of Shipping. 1919 – via Internet Archive.
- Mercantile Navy List. London. 1891 – via Crew List Index Project.
