= SS Sutlej =

Steamship

- SS Sutlej

History
- Name: Sutlej (c.1907–1929); Cape St. Francis (1929–)
- Owner: Nourse Line (c.1907–1929); Sun Shipping Company (1929–)
- Builder: Charles Connell & Company Limited
- Launched: c.1907

General characteristics
- Type: Steamship
- Tonnage: 3,549 tons
- Installed power: Triple expansion steam engine 425 hp (317 kW)
- Propulsion: Single screw

SS Sutlej was a 3,549 ton steamship built for the Nourse Line in about 1907 by Charles Connell & Company Limited, Glasgow. She had single screw, triple expansion, 425 horsepower (317 kW) engines.

Like other Nourse Line ships, she was primarily used for the transportation of Indian indentured labourers to the colonies. Details of some of these voyages are as follows:

Destination	Date of Arrival	Number of Passengers	Deaths During Voyage
Surinam	22 February 1908	n/a	n/a
Trinidad	1 October 1908	547	4
British Guiana	1909	n/a	n/a
British Guiana	1910	n/a	n/a
Surinam	27 January 1910	n/a	n/a
Fiji	25 June 1911	850	n/a
Fiji	4 October 1911	811	n/a
Trinidad	14 January 1912	432	3
Fiji	27 April 1912	857	n/a
Trinidad	11 December 1912	372	5
Fiji	11 April 1913	808	n/a
Trinidad	23 October 1913	423	1
Surinam	7 January 1914	n/a	n/a
Trinidad	13 October 1914	244	1
British Guiana	1916	n/a	n/a
Fiji	11 November 1916	888	n/a

Sutlej was the last ship to transport Indian indentured labourers to Fiji. In 1929, she was sold to Sun Shipping Company, London renamed Cape St. Francis.

== See also ==
- Indian Indenture Ships to Fiji
- Indian indenture system
