= Howrah (ship) =

History

United Kingdom
- Name: Howrah
- Owner: Tyser & Haviside
- Builder: Pile, Spence and Company, Sunderland
- Launched: 4 June 1864

General characteristics
- Class & type: Iron-hulled sailing ship
- Tons burthen: 1,098 tons

The Howrah was an iron hulled sailing ship of 1,098 tons, built at Sunderland in 1864 by Pile, Spence and Company. She arrived in Fiji on 26 June 1884 carrying 575 passengers.

The Howrah was chartered for three voyages from England to New Zealand. During one of these voyages, although she made the passage in 96 days, she encountered some very rough weather and ten passengers died.

The Howrah was also used to carry indentured labourers to the West Indies. She arrived in British Guiana on 13 Feb 1869, Trinidad on 3 March 1873 carrying 449 (13 died during the trip) and Suriname on 8 April 1874 carrying Indian indentured labourers.

== See also ==
- Indian indenture ships to Fiji
- Indian indenture system
