= SS Selma =

Several steamships have borne the name Selma:

- SS Selma (1871) was a 1,172-ton cargo ship launched as the Elf on 19 August 1871, by William Doxford & Sons, Pallion, England. She was renamed several times, in 1900 Selma. She was wrecked on 31 March 1901, while carrying a cargo of phosphate.
- SS Selma (1896) was a 3,480-ton cargo ship launched on 15 February 1896, by William Doxford & Sons, Pallion, England. Wrecked off Cape Frio on 17 September 1910.
- SS Selma (1906) was a 1,629-ton cargo ship launched as the Cassiopeia on 2 November 1906, by Nylands Verksted in Oslo, Norway. Renamed Selma in 1915. Mined and sunk off North Foreland on 25 October 1915.
- SS Selma (1919) was a 6,287-ton concrete-constructed tanker built for the US government and completed in January 1920, by Ley in Mobile, USA. Wrecked off Galveston on 20 January 1922.
- SS Selma (1921) was a 1,746-ton cargo ship launched on 17 June 1921, by Howaldtswerke in Kiel, Germany. Renamed Rhön in 1924. Scuttled off Arendal, Norway on 8 September 1946.
- SS Selma (1924) was a 1,377-ton cargo ship launched as the Hamlet on 30 September 1924 by Howaldtswerke in Kiel, Germany. Renamed Selma in 1927. Exploded and sank in Oslo, Norway, on 11 January 1944.
- SS Selma (1937) was a 1,392-ton cargo ship launched on 23 September 1937 by Fredrikstad Mekaniske Verksted in Fredrikstad, Norway. Renamed four times, broken up in Brindisi, Italy, in May 1971
