= SS Fazilka =

British merchant steamship

History

United Kingdom
- Name: Fazilka
- Namesake: Fazilka
- Owner: British India SN Co
- Port of registry: Glasgow
- Builder: Wm Doxford & Sons, Pallion
- Yard number: 199
- Laid down: 12 May 1890
- Launched: 17 August 1890
- Completed: 11 October 1890
- Identification: UK official number 98578; code letters LVMS; 1918: call sign GDA
- Fate: wrecked, 1919

General characteristics
- Type: cargo liner
- Tonnage: 4,152 GRT, 2,698 NRT, 5,900 DWT
- Length: 366.0 ft (111.6 m)
- Beam: 48.2 ft (14.7 m)
- Draught: 23 ft 8 in (7.2 m)
- Depth: 26.5 ft (8.1 m)
- Decks: 3
- Installed power: 462 NHP, 2,453 ihp
- Propulsion: 1 × triple-expansion engine; 1 × screw
- Sail plan: two masts
- Speed: 11 1/2 knots (21.3 km/h)
- Capacity: cargo: 240,916 cubic feet (6,822 m^{3}); passengers: 12 × 1st class, 1,650 × deck class
- Notes: sister ship: Fultala

SS Fazilka was a cargo liner of the British India Steam Navigation Company (BI), built in 1890 by William Doxford & Sons at Sunderland. She was a sister ship of Fultala, and could carry 12 first-class passengers and up to 1,650 on deck. She operated mostly in the Indian Ocean, between India and East Africa and between India and Cape Colony. In the Second Boer War she served as a troopship. In February 1900, while returning from Natal, her propeller shaft broke. Her engineers rigged sails and then improvised a repair, and she reached Colombo under her own power in March. From 1901 to 1907 she made six voyages carrying Indian indentured labourers to Fiji. She was again a troopship in 1915 and was placed under the Liner Requisition Scheme in 1917. On 31 October 1919 she ran aground on Great Nicobar Island and sank the next day, with the loss of two crew.

== Construction ==
In 1890 William Doxford & Sons at Pallion in Sunderland built a pair of sister ships for BI. Yard number 199 was laid down on 12 May 1890, launched on 17 August, and delivered on 11 October. She was named after the city of Fazilka in the Punjab. Yard number 200 was launched on 4 October as Fultala, and completed that November.

Fazilka's registered length was 366.0 ft (111.6 m), her beam was 48.2 ft (14.7 m), her depth was 26.5 ft (8.1 m), and her draught was 23 ft 8 in (7.2 m). Her tonnages were 4,152 GRT, 2,698 NRT, and 5,900 DWT. Her holds had capacity for 240,916 cubic feet (6,822 m^{3}) of cargo. She had berths for 12 first class passengers, and was licensed to carry 1,650 unberthed passengers on deck.

Fazilka had a single screw, driven by a three-cylinder triple-expansion engine. It was rated at 462 NHP or 2,453 ihp, and gave her a speed of 11 1/2 knots (21.3 km/h).

== First decade ==
BI registered Fazilka at Glasgow. Her United Kingdom official number was 98578 and her code letters were LVMS. She operated in the Indian Ocean between India and East Africa, and between India and Cape Colony.

On 27 July 1892 Fazilka was approaching Calcutta from Singapore when she grounded on Hooghly Point. On a voyage in October 1897 she ran short of coal, and her crew had to burn mostof her wooden fittings to reach port.

All BI ships were designed to be converted into troop ships, by putting troop accommodation in the holds. In the Second Boer War the UK Government chartered at least 37 BI ships for war service. On 6 January 1900 Fazilka embarked part of the 16th The Queen's Lancers at Bombay (now Mumbai). On 21 January she reached Port Elizabeth in Cape Colony.

== Broken propeller shaft ==
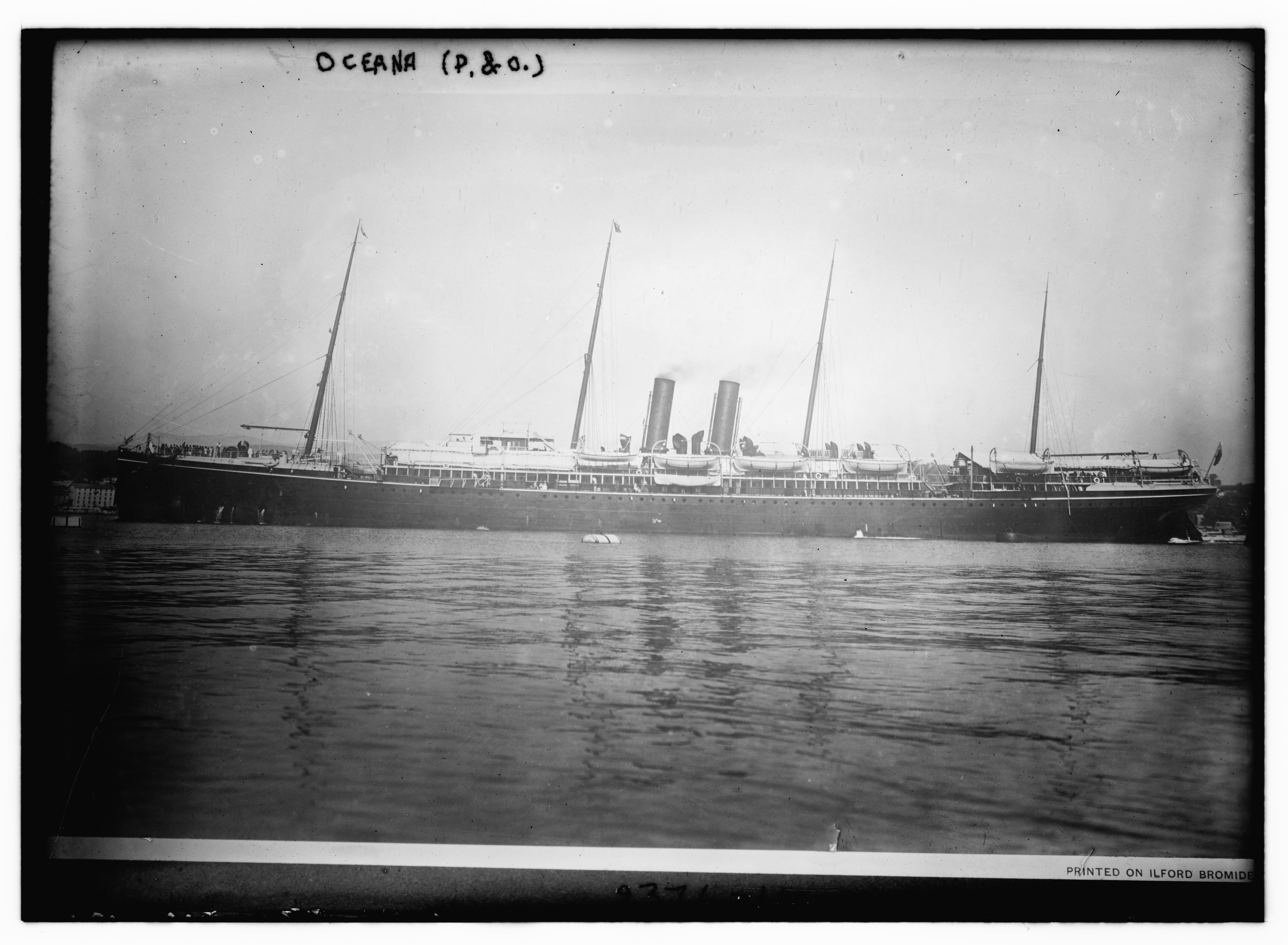
P&O's Oceana, which tried to tow Fazilka in February 1900

On 30 January 1900 Fazilka left Durban in ballast. She crossed the Indian Ocean via the Mozambique Channel and Mauritius. On 6 February, hile she was still 430 nautical miles (800 km) from land, her propeller shaft broke in two places, rupturing her stern tube. Her crew shifted her ballast forward, which lowered her bow in the water and raised her propeller clear of the surface. Her engineers tried unsuccessfully to repair the shaft.

On 12 February one of her engineers, Lachlan Brown, directed the jury rigging of a set of sails on both of her masts. The next day the P&O steamship Oceana came across Fazilka and tried to tow her to Colombo in Ceylon. The tow line broke, and Fazilka's Master, Captain Goss, declined further help, but accepted additional victuals.

Eventually Brown dismantled the high-pressure cylinder of Fazilka's main engine in order to cannibalise its brass bearing on the crankpin. He used this to secure the propeller shaft, and used a Thompson coupling to repair the rear end break. The repair was successful, and Fazilka managed 9 knots (17 km/h) using only the high-pressure and intermediate-pressure cylinders of her engine.

On 23 March she reached Colombo under her own power. BI rewarded her engineers. Her Fourth Engineer, Joch MacDonald, was awarded a gold watch and £30.

== Later career ==
From 1901 to 1907 Fazilka made six voyages taking Indian indentured labourers to Fiji, as shown in the table below.

Fiji voyages
Voyage Number	Date of Arrival	Number of Passengers
I	28 March 1901	804
II	18 June 1901	776
III	20 June 1902	840
IV	17 April 1906	881
V	28 January 1907	875
VI	25 April 1907	796

In 1904 Fazilka made a voyage carrying emigrants from London to Brisbane. In July 1905, during the Russo-Japanese War, the Russian auxiliary cruisers Kuban stopped and searched her in the Red Sea. Kuban allowed Fazilka to proceed.

In 1915 Fazilka served as a troop ship. In 1917 she came under the Liner Requisition Scheme. In 1918 she was returned to BI, who put her on the route between Madras (now Chennai) and the Straits Settlements.

By 1918 Fazilka was equipped with wireless telegraphy. Her call sign was GDA.

== Loss ==
On 31 October 1919 Fazilka was en route from Penang to Calcutta when she grounded in poor weather on the east coast of Great Nicobar Island. She stayed on an even keel, but water rose in all four of her holds. Her passengers transferred to the Dutch government steamship Sabang, which took them back to Penang. The next day Fazilka sank, and two of her crew were killed. The rest of her complement came ashore safely.

== See also ==
- List of Indian indenture ships to Fiji

== Bibliography ==
- Blake, George (1956). B.I. Centenary. London: Collins.
- Haws, Duncan (1987). British India S.N. Co. Merchant Fleets. Vol. 11. Burwash: Travel Creatours Ltd Publications. ISBN 0-946378-07-X.
- Lloyd's Register of British and Foreign Shipping. Vol. I.–Steamers. London: Lloyd's Register of Shipping. 1891 – via Internet Archive.
- The Marconi Press Agency Ltd (1918). The Year Book of Wireless Telegraphy and Telephony. London: The Wireless Press, Ltd.
- Mercantile Navy List. London. 1891 – via Crew List Index Project.
