= Pericles (ship) =

History

United Kingdom
- Name: Pericles
- Owner: Aberdeen Line
- Builder: W. Hood & Co, Aberdeen
- Launched: 11 July 1877

History

Norway
- Acquired: 1912
- Renamed: Sjurso, 1916
- Fate: Scrapped at Kiel, Sept. 1923

General characteristics
- Class & type: Iron hulled, three masted sailing ship
- Tons burthen: 1,598 tons

Pericles, named after the Athenian leader Pericles, was a 1,598 ton, iron hulled, three masted sailing ship, that was built by W. Hood & Co of Aberdeen, and launched in July 1877 to transport wool for the Aberdeen Line.

== Trips to Australia ==
Pericles was a fast ship and her maiden voyage from London to Melbourne took 71 days. She continued to be used on the passenger route to Australia, arriving in Sydney from London, via Plymouth on 5 December 1877 and 10 November 1878. On 31 July 1879 en route to Sydney she grounded on Pericles Point near the Helford River in thick fog. Pericles had a close call as Penere Point is near The Manacles, a reef which has claimed over one hundred ships. Two hours later, on a rising tide, she refloated and continued on her journey to Sydney. The following day her fore peak was found flooded and Captain Largie turned the ship around and returned to Plymouth for repairs.

== Trip to Fiji ==
She made a trip to Fiji carrying 461 Indian indentured labourers and arriving at Suva on 3 July 1884. There was an outbreak of cholera during the voyage, with thirty-five cases being reported and twenty deaths.

== Sale and scrap ==
In 1904, Pericles was sold to a Norwegian buyer and changed ownership twice more before being renamed Sjurso in 1916. She was scrapped at Kiel in September 1923.

== See also ==
- Indian indenture ships to Fiji
- Indians in Fiji
- Indian indenture system
