= SS Mutlah =

History
- Name: SS Mutlah
- Owner: Nourse Line (1907-1921); Soc di Nav Latina (1921-1923); Occidens Soc. Anon di Nav (1923)
- Port of registry: United Kingdom (1907-1921); Italy (1921-1923)
- Builder: Charles Connell & Company Limited, Glasgow
- Launched: 16 April 1907
- Fate: Disappeared 29 December 1923

General characteristics
- Type: Cargo ship
- Tonnage: 3641 gross register tons
- Length: 106.56 metres (349 feet 7 inches)
- Beam: 13.41 metres (44 feet 0 inches)
- Draught: 5.91 metres (19 feet 5 inches)
- Propulsion: Triple expansion steam engine 425 hp (317 kW), one shaft
- Speed: 12 knots

SS Mutlah was a 3,393-ton steamship built for the Nourse Line in 1907 by Charles Connell & Company Limited, Glasgow, Scotland. She disappeared along with her crew of 40 after sending a distress call on 29 December 1923 while sailing in the Mediterranean Sea. The ship had triple expansion, 425-nhp (317-kW) steam engines driving a single screw.

Like other Nourse Line ships, she had primarily been used for the transport of Indian indentured labourers to the colonies. Details of some of these voyages are as follows:

Destination	Date of Arrival	Number of Passengers	Deaths During Voyage
Trinidad	4 September 1907	844	11
Trinidad	4 September 1908	415	7
Suriname	2 May 1909	834	n/a
Trinidad	29 August 1909	832	8
Trinidad	7 October 1910	770	13
Trinidad	25 January 1911	842	9
Fiji	22 May 1911	834	n/a
Fiji	18 August 1911	863	n/a
Trinidad	28 December 1911	705	2
Suriname	14 May 1912	842	9
Trinidad	14 October 1912	445	1
Trinidad	5 February 1913	317	2
Suriname	23 June 1913	n/a	n/a
Trinidad	26 November 1913	209	0
Trinidad	20 January 1914	279	0
Fiji	7 May 1915	852	n/a
Fiji	1 August 1915	812	n/a

Mutlah caught fire at Naples, Italy, and sank on 24 March 1920. She was refloated, repaired, and returned to service.

In 1921 she was purchased by Soc di Nav Latina, Naples, Italy. In 1923 she was purchased by Occidens Soc. Anon di Nav, Genoa, Italy.

On 29 December 1923 she was in the Mediterranean Sea west-southwest of Sardinia on a voyage from Cagliari, Sardinia, Italy, to Antwerp, Belgium, with a cargo of grain when she sent a distress signal, reporting her position as 38°40′N 006°34′E. She then disappeared without trace. She is presumed to have foundered with the loss of all hands.

== See also ==
- Indian Indenture Ships to Fiji
- Indian indenture system
