= Surgeon-superintendent =

A surgeon-superintendent was a position, held by a surgeon officer of the Royal Navy, on board convict transport ship and ships transporting indentured labour, with overall authority in all non-nautical matters.

Before 1792, authority over convicts during transportation was wielded by the ship captain. For various reasons this arrangement resulted in neglect of the convicts' health and well-being, and there were many deaths. Often the deaths during a single voyage would number in the hundreds. In 1792, the decision was made to appoint the ship's surgeon to a position of authority in all matters not directly related to the sailing of the ship. This was an immediate success, reducing the death rate to no more than around ten per voyage.

A surgeon-superintendent was a role that comprised 57 duties covering embarkation, voyage, and arrival for all assisted and bounty ships sailing under the Colonial Land and Emigration Commission. This was a system whereby Australian land was sold to raise money in order to assist English, Scottish and Irish emigrants who were free, without indenture, yet could not afford the full passage of the trip to Australia.

Officially styled "superintendent", the responsibilities of the surgeon-superintendent were largely equivalent to that of a Naval Agent. However they also continued to fulfill the role of a naval surgeon, and so were commonly referred to by the title "surgeon-superintendent".
