= SS Ganges =

A number of steamships have been named Ganges, including:

- SS Ganges (1906), built for Nourse Line, requisitioned during the First World War
- SS Ganges (1930), built for Nourse Line by Harland and Wolff, sunk by the Japanese in 1942
- SS Ganges (1947), a West German cargo ship in service 1954–59

== See also ==
- Ganges (disambiguation) for other ships named Ganges
