= Nourse Line =

- House flag
- Industry: Shipping
- Founded: 1861
- Founder: James Nourse
- Defunct: 1917
- Fate: acquired by P&O
- Headquarters: England

The Nourse Line was a shipping company formed by Captain James Nourse in 1861. After taking delivery of his first ship, the Ganges, in 1861, Nourse went on to build up one of the last great fleets of sailing ships.

== Early life of James Nourse ==
James Nourse was born in County Dublin in 1828 and after serving the required time at sea obtained his Master’s Certificate in London in 1851 and was hired as captain on a ship owned by WN Lindsay of London. A year later, he joined Foley, Aikman & Company of Glasgow as Master aboard the Aberfoyle. Nourse served in the ship for three years before it caught fire. He then became the captain of the Tasmania until 1861.

== Establishing the fleet ==
Nourse bought his first ship, the 839 ton iron hulled sailing vessel, Ganges in 1861, by buying 75% share in the ship bought ship builders Pile, Hay & Company of Sunderland. The Ganges sailed to India to trade between Calcutta and Australia where James Nourse made acquaintance with the owners of Sandbach, Tinne & Company who were importers and exporters, mainly concerned with sugar, coffee, rum, molasses and also trafficking in Melanesian labour. Nourse saw a future in these trades and relinquished his command of Ganges to concentrate on management. He went set up an office in London in 1864 and acquired full ownership of Ganges. James Nourse secured a contract with the Crown Agents for the Colonies, to provide service between India and Mauritius, the West Indies and Fiji. Once the contracts were secured James Nourse bought another ship and chartered a third.

== Transporting Indian indentured labour ==
He then began transporting Indian indentured labourers to the West Indies. The general route for the fleet was to leave a European port with a cargo of salt or railway iron for Calcutta. From there a cargo of rice and indentured labourers were picked up for the West Indies, followed by a passage to the east coast of North America where grain or oil was loaded for Europe. Some ships sailed back direct to Calcutta from the West Indies with labourers who had completed their contract of employment. Other voyages were made from Calcutta to Mauritius or to the Fiji Islands with labour for the sugar plantations. Voyages to Fiji usually returned to Calcutta via Australia with cargoes of coal.

Between 1866 and 1869 the company built four more ships with the transportation of indentured labourers in mind, which dictated that each one and a half registered tons equalled the carriage of one passenger, and later the space was measured in covered deck space. The medical requirements of those travelling was monitored by a Surgeon Superintendent, and food and water allowances by the ships Purser and both Officers were paid a per capita grant for those successfully completing the voyage. Two further ships were acquired in 1872 and 1873 and in 1874 Nourse ordered a further five new ships. In the eighteen eighties, Nourse Line increased the size of its fleet by another fifteen vessels. The company continued to build sailing ships until well into the eighteen nineties when most other ship owners had made the transition to steam ships. His reasons were that he understood sailing ships and that they were economical for the trades in which they served. Nourse Line continued to purchase both new and second hand vessels.

== After the death of James Nourse ==
James Nourse died in April 1897, and his executors CA Hampton]] (his main creditor) and E Bromehead assumed control of both his affairs and the fleet. The ships continued to trade, as before, but on 19 February 1903 they became part of a limited liability company, James Nourse Limited, with CA Hampton as its first chairman.

== Steam Ships ==
Nourse Line finally recognised the emergence of steam in May 1904 when it took delivery of its first steamship, Indus. Nourse Line gradually began to phase out her outdated sailing ships and by 1908 all had either been sold or scrapped. By the outbreak of World War I Nourse had purchased a further five ships and operated them from Calcutta to the West Indies on a regular monthly service. The ships were heavily mortgaged and to operate them to capacity the company often acted not only as shipowners but also as freight agents purchasing and selling commodities in their own right.

== World War I ==
The end of the Indentured Labour System coincided with the start of World War I and thus any effect of the loss of labour transportation contract was delayed until the end of the war. Nourse Line lost two of its ships during the war, Indus and Dewa, and both were replaced almost immediately by Megna, purchased in 1916 and Betwa, initially designed as an indentured labour carrier but later altered to that of a cargo ship and delivered in 1917. In an attempt to minimise its war risks and maintain its ships numbers P&O in 1917 purchased Nourse Line, Union Steamship Company of New Zealand and the Hain Steamship Company.

== See also ==
- Indian Indenture Ships to Fiji
