= Roti =

South Asian flatbread

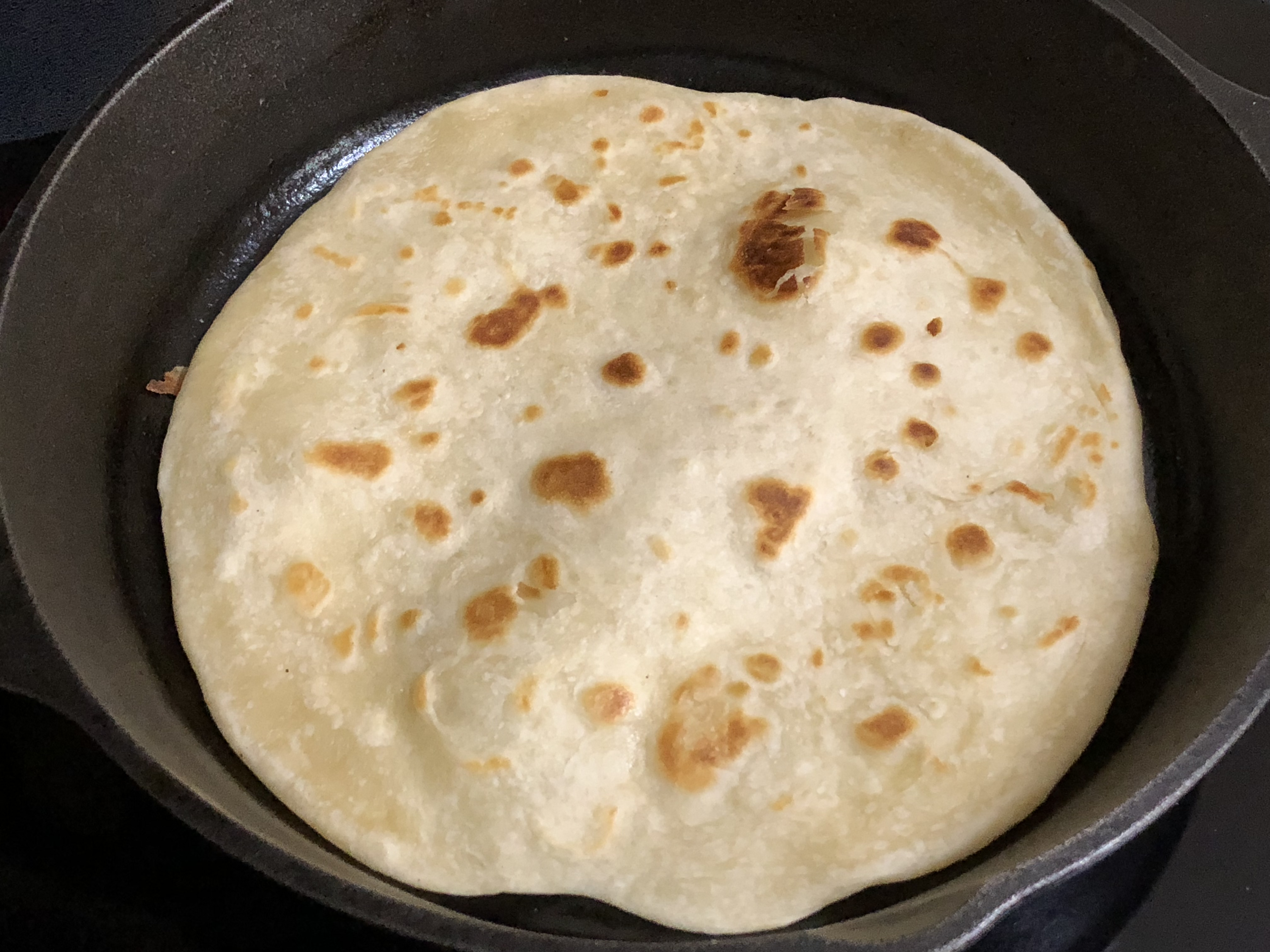
- Flat roti, also known as chapati
- Alternative names: Ruti
- Type: Flatbread
- Place of origin: Indian subcontinent
- Main ingredients: Atta flour
- Variations: Chapati, bajra roti, jowar roti, chawal ki roti, makki ki roti, rumali roti, tandoori roti, wrap roti, roti canai, paratha

Roti (IPA: [ɾoːʈiː]) is a round flatbread originating from the Indian subcontinent. It is commonly consumed in many South Asian, Southeast Asian, Caribbean, East African, and Southeast African countries.

Roti is made from stoneground whole-wheat flour, known as atta, combined with water to form dough. Its defining characteristic is that it is unleavened. Naan from the Indian subcontinent, by contrast, is a yeast-leavened bread, as is kulcha. Like breads around the world, roti is a staple accompaniment to other foods.

== Etymology ==
The word roti is derived from the Sanskrit word roṭikā, meaning "bread".

== Types ==
1. Makki roti: corn flour roti served with sarson ka saag, a classic dish of Punjab.
2. Akki roti: Rice flour roti with grated vegetables and spices, served with chutney, a famous dish of Karnataka.
3. Thalipeeth roti: Maharashtrian roti is made with bajra, jowar, rice, chickpea, and spices, served with yogurt or ghee, also popular in Karnataka.
4. Missi roti: Rajasthani roti similar to chapati with added spices like red chili, cumin, and turmeric, served with gravy or vegetables.
5. Kuttu roti: Buckwheat flour roti with potatoes, gluten-free and common during Navratri fasting.
6. Rumali roti: Thin, soft roti foldable like a handkerchief, popular in Awadhi, Mughlai, and Hyderabadi cuisine, best served with gravy.
7. Gur roti: Jaggery and whole wheat flour roti, small and thick, also known as meethi (sweet) roti.

== Preparation ==
Roti is made from a mixture of flour, water, and optionally salt and butter or oil. The ingredients are mixed together to create a dough which is left to rest. The dough is then divided into balls which are flattened with a rolling pin to form rotis. The rotis are then cooked on a tava or pan.

== Variants ==
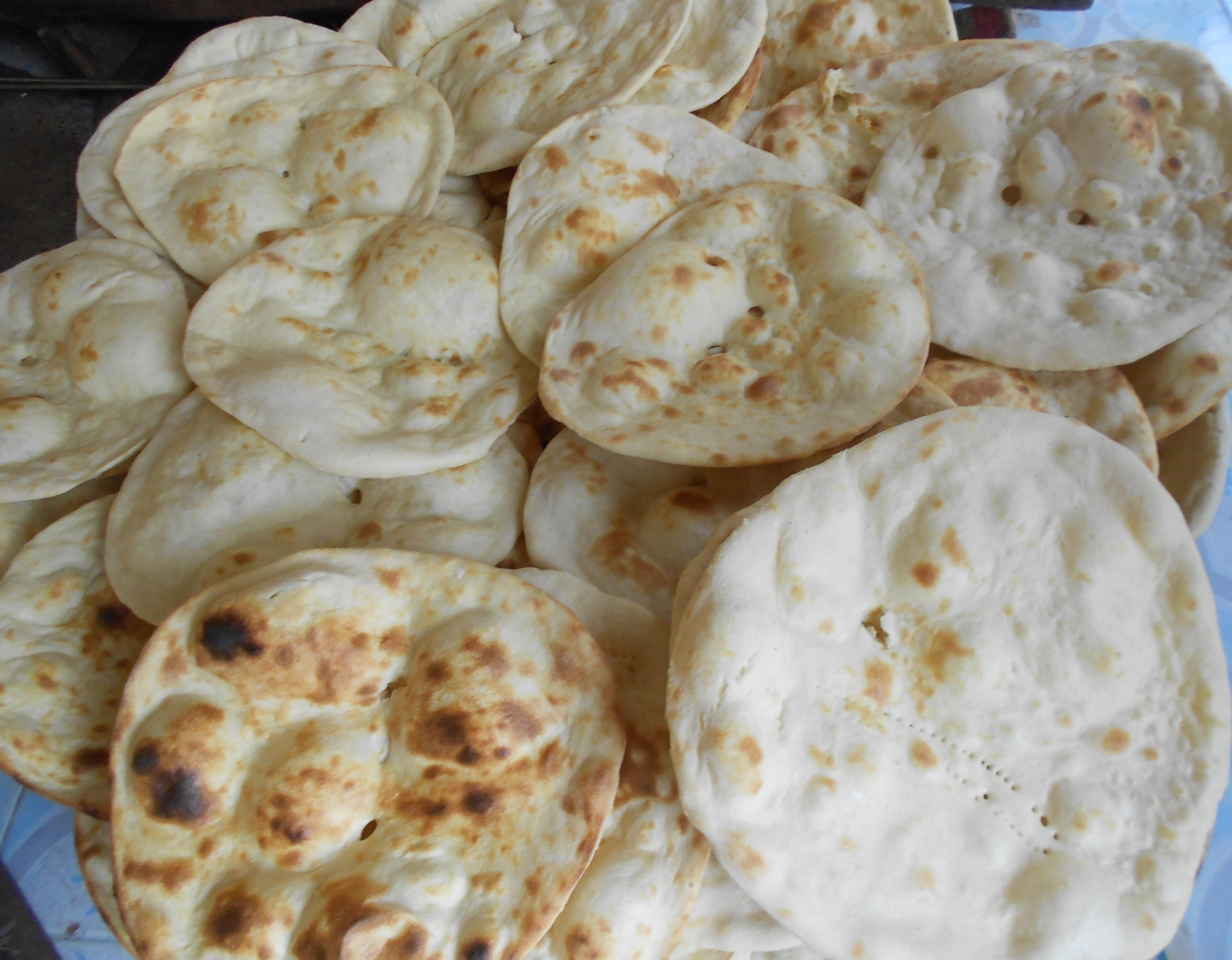
Roti in the Indian subcontinent

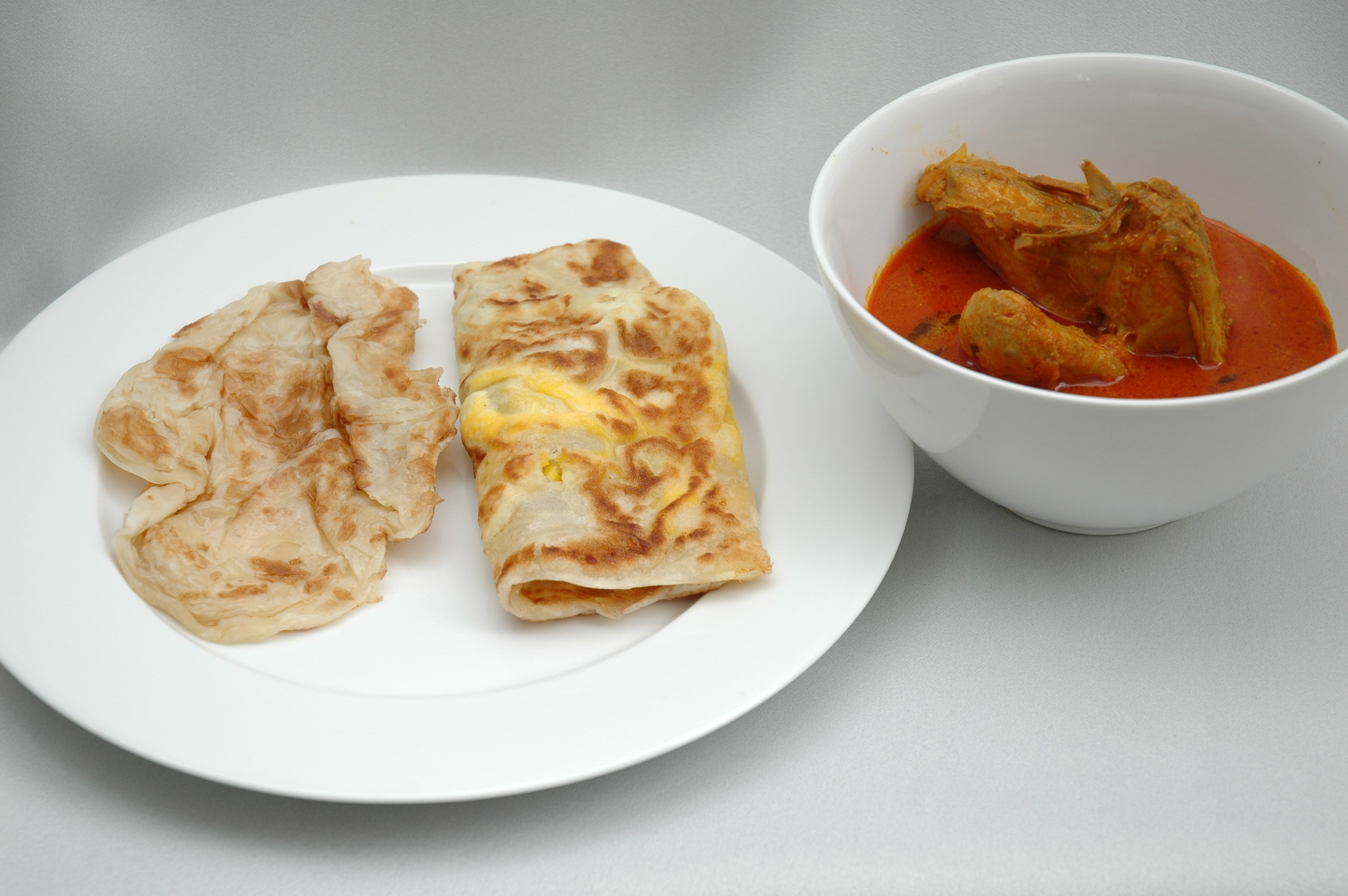
Singaporean roti prata served with curry

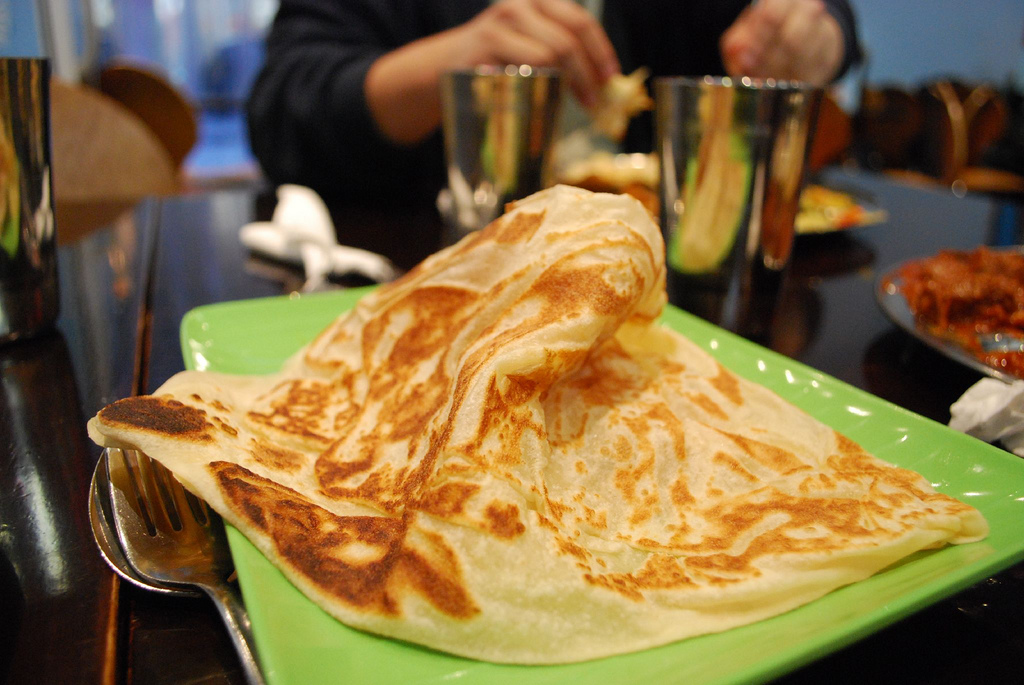
Plain roti paratha

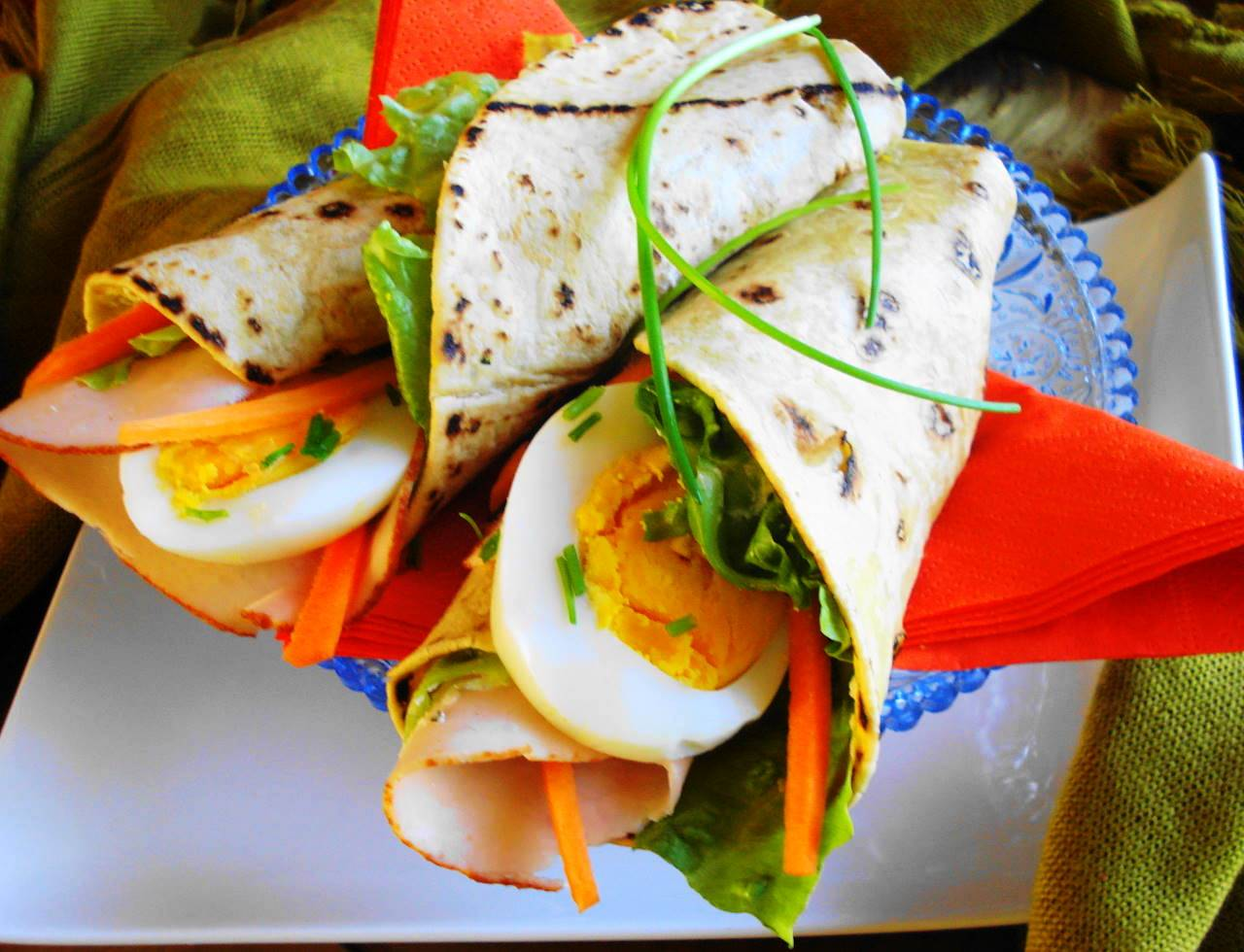
A Surinamese roti wrap with boiled egg and smoked chicken in the Netherlands

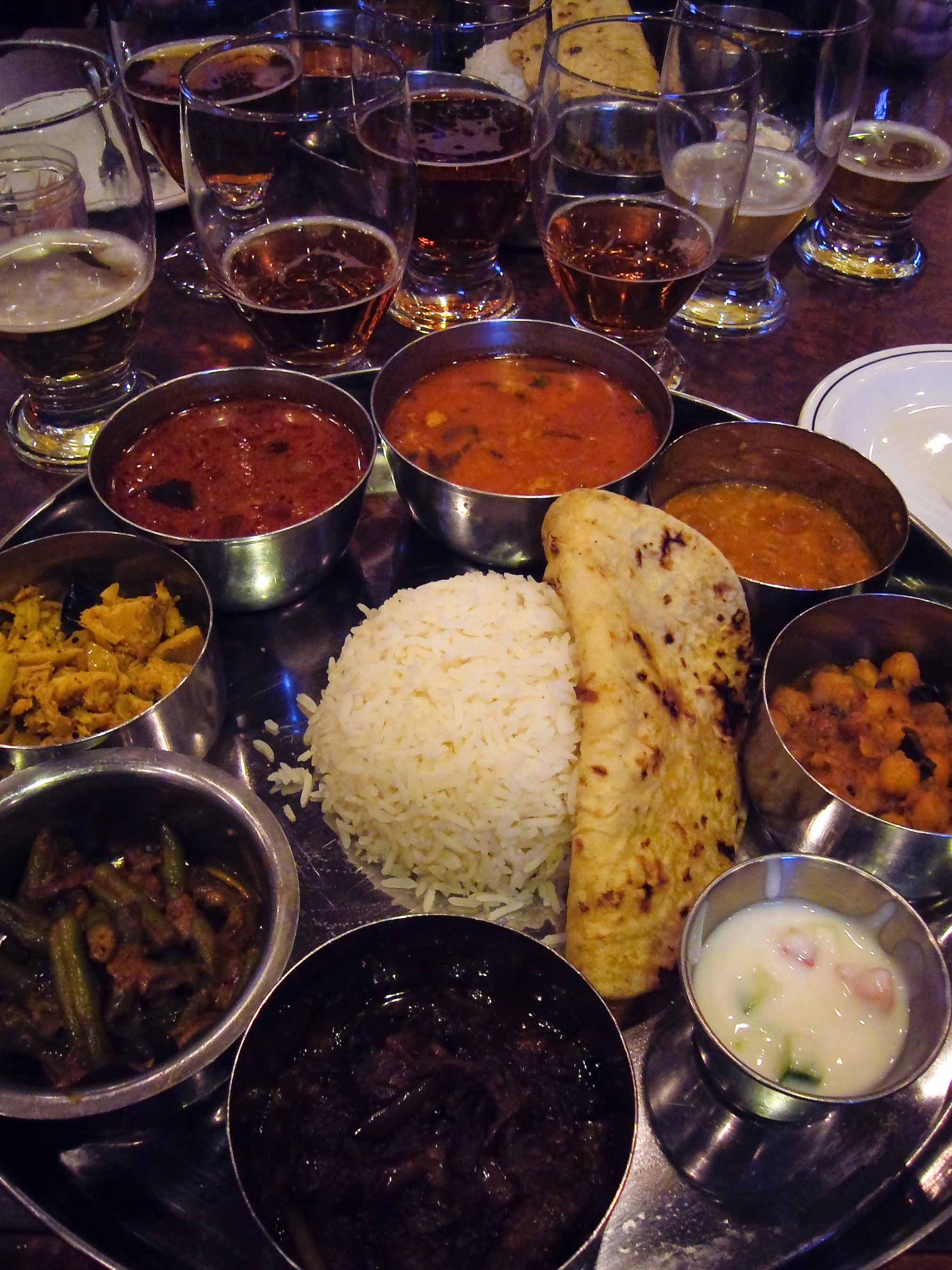
Indian thali with chapati

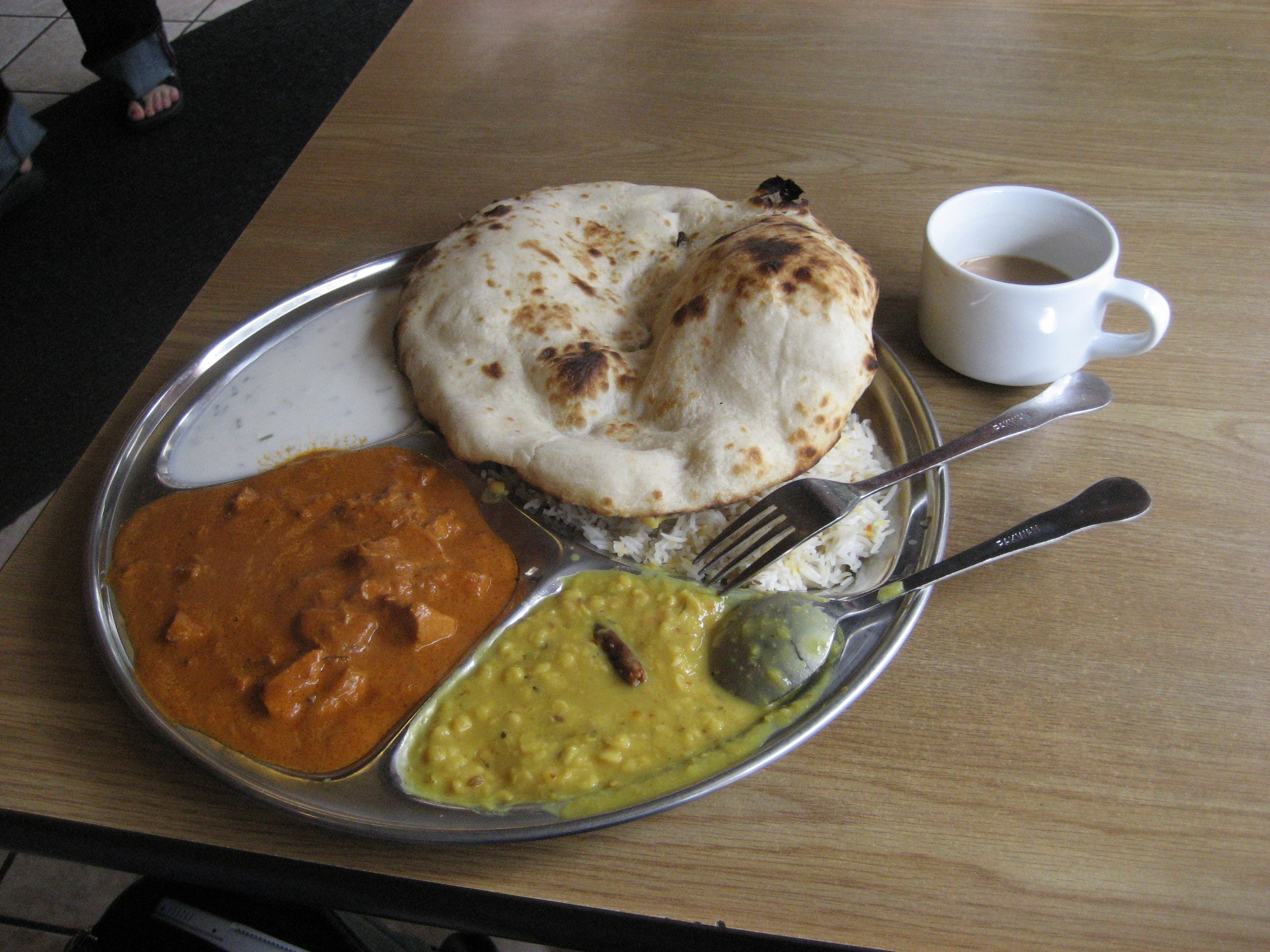
Tandoori roti served with other dishes in an Indian restaurant

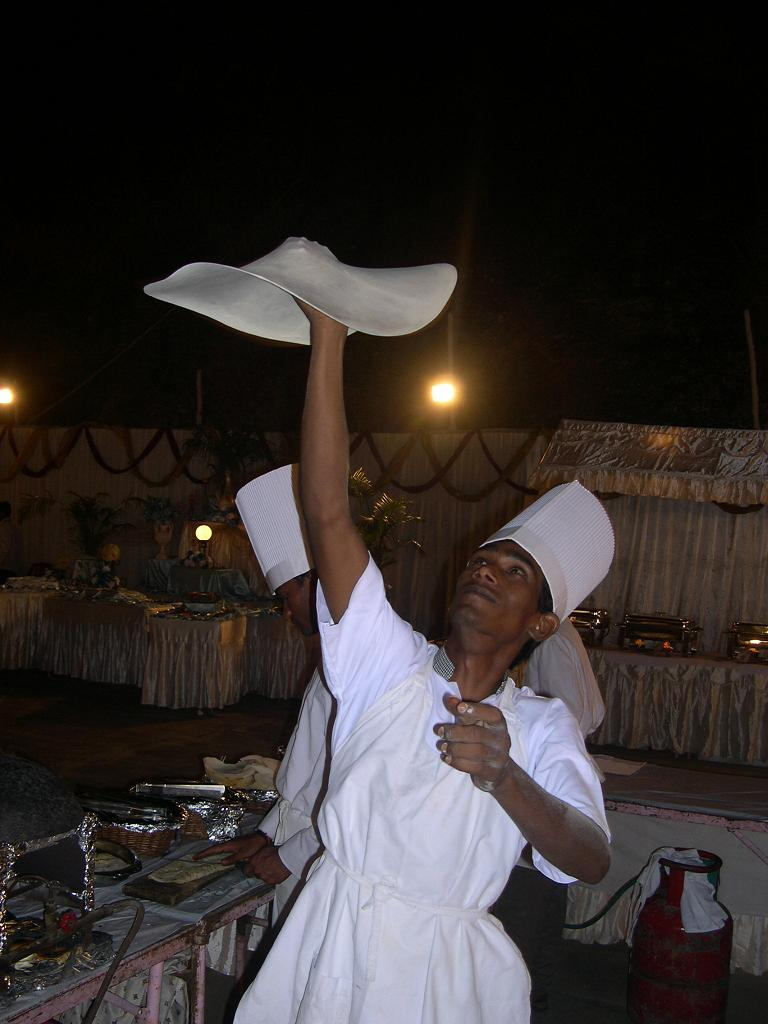
A chef preparing rumali roti in India

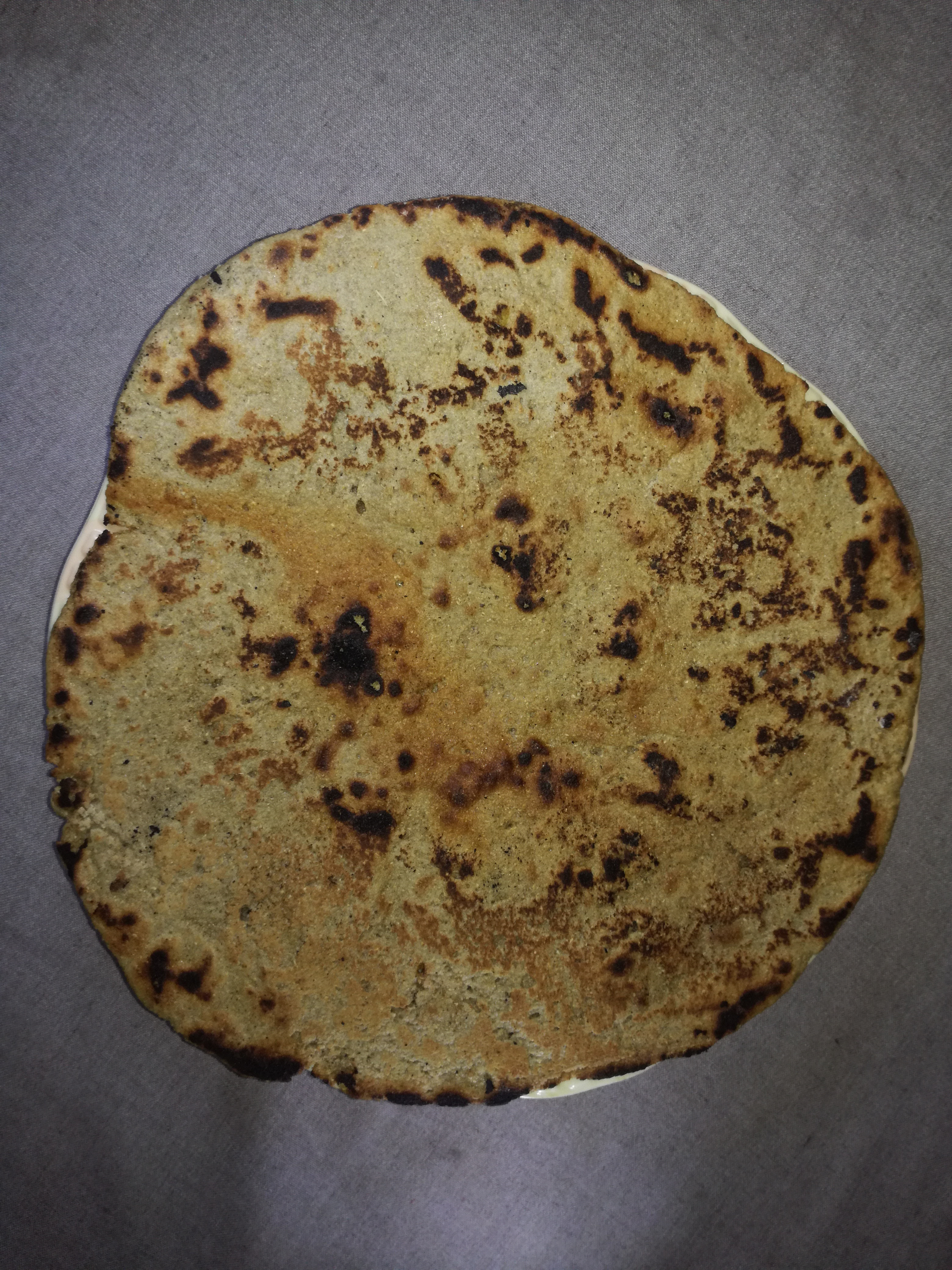
Bajhar ji maani (bajra roti) in Tharparkar, Pakistan

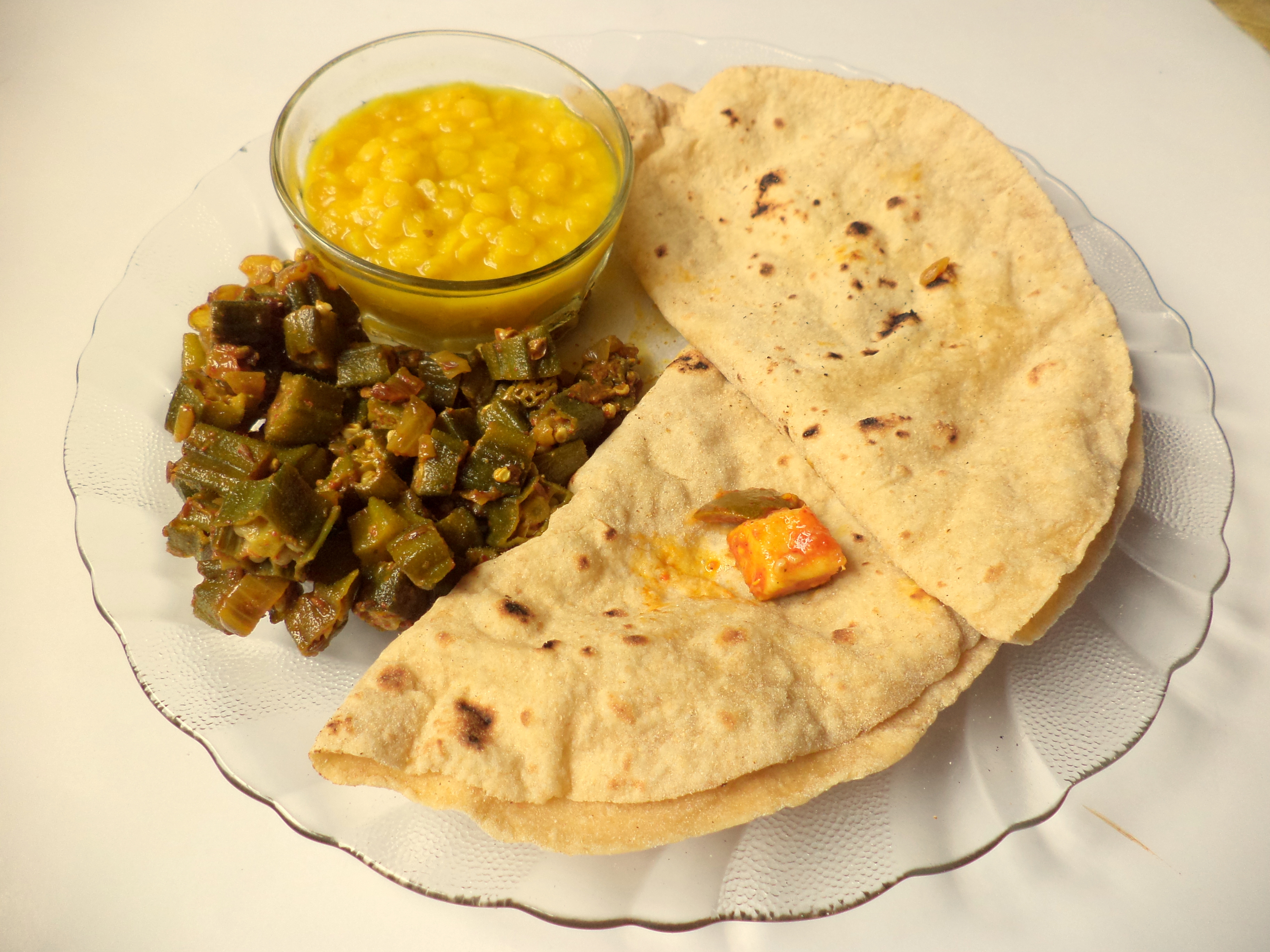
Spicy vegetables served with rotis

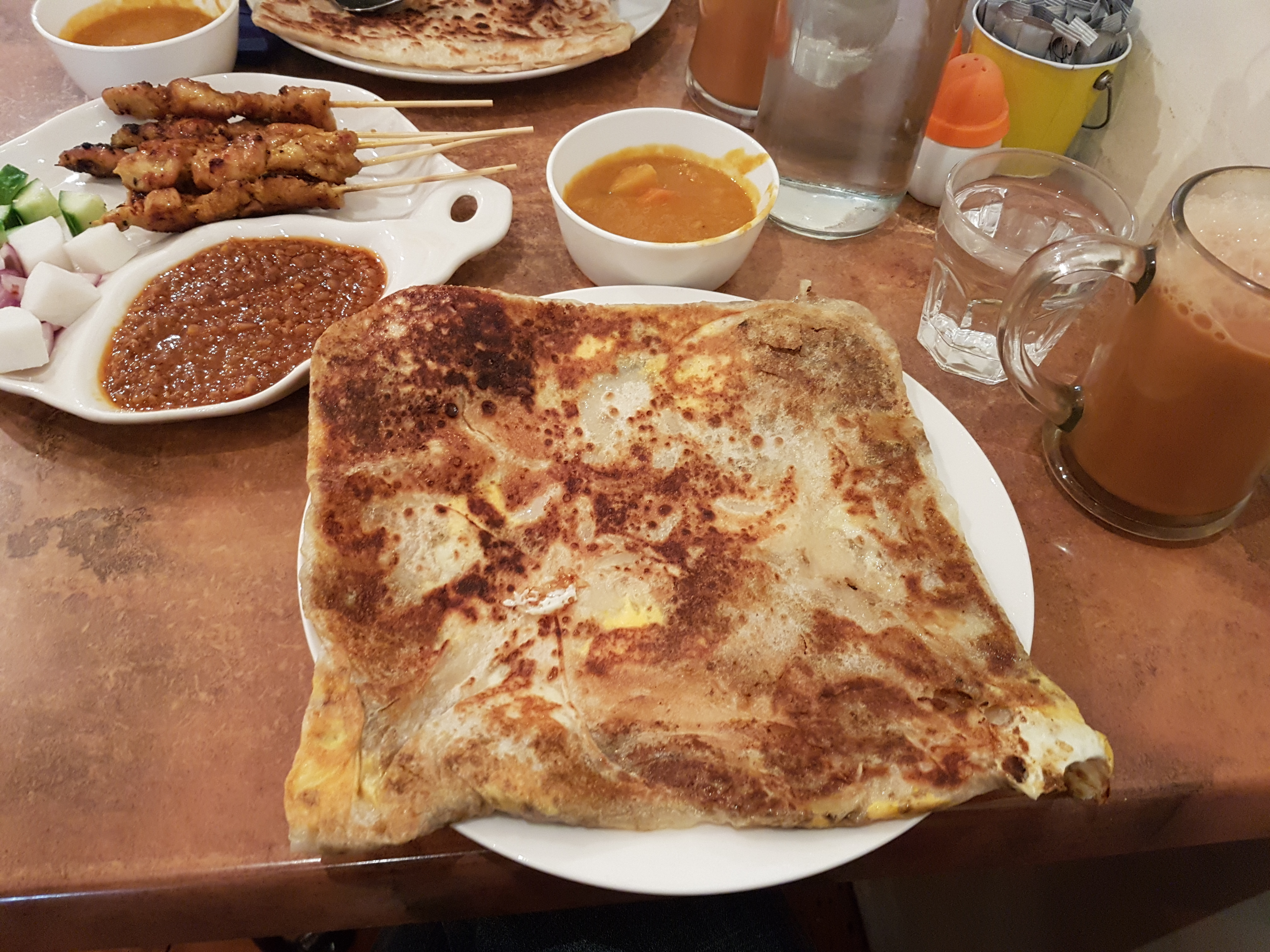
Roti stuffed with bananas

=== Indian subcontinent ===
Many variations of flatbreads and roti are found in many cultures across the globe, from the Indian subcontinent to Africa to Oceania to the Malay Peninsula to the Americas. The roti is a traditional flatbread from the Indian subcontinent. It is normally eaten with cooked vegetables or curries; it can be used as a carrier for them. It is made most often from wheat flour, cooked on a flat or slightly concave iron griddle called a tawa. Traditionally, rotis have also been made from the flour of millet, maize, jowar, bajra, and even rice. Tandoori roti is cooked by sticking the flattened dough to the inside wall of a tandoor oven, where it bakes quickly at a high temperature. Chapatis are made of whole-wheat flour known as atta, mixed into a dough with water, edible oil and optional salt in a mixing utensil called a parat, and is cooked on a tava (flat skillet). It is known as phulka in Punjabi and Saraiki, and maani in Sindhi.

==== Sri Lanka ====
In Sri Lanka, there is a variant of roti called pol roti (coconut roti), made of wheat flour, and/or kurakkan flour, and scraped coconut. Sometimes, chopped green chilis and onion are added to the mixture before cooking. These are usually thicker and harder than other roti types. They are usually eaten with curries, or some types of sambol or lunu miris and considered a main meal rather than a supplement.

Another variety of roti popular in Sri Lanka is kottu roti, which is made up of paratha or godamba roti, These are cut into small pieces, small in size and rectangular or square in shape. Then on a square heating pan, vegetables and onions are fried. Eggs, cooked meat, or fish are added to fried vegetables and heated for a few minutes. Finally, the pieces of cut paratha are added. These are chopped and mixed by repeated pounding using heavy iron blades/spatula, the sound of which can be heard from a long distance. Depending upon what ingredients are used, the variations are vegetable, egg, chicken, beef, mutton, and fish kottu roti. It is sometimes prepared and served as a fast food dish.

Godamba roti is another variety found in Sri Lanka. Plain godamba roti is eaten with curry or it can also be wrapped around a savory filling.

Plain chapati/roti, commercially prepared
Nutritional value per 100 g (3.5 oz)
- Energy: 1,245 kJ (298 kcal)
- Carbohydrates: 46.36 g
- Sugars: 2.72
- Dietary fiber: 4.9 g
- Fat: 7.45 g
- Protein: 11.25 g
Vitamins and minerals
| Vitamins | Quantity %DV^{†} |
| Thiamine (B1) | 46% 0.55 mg |
| Riboflavin (B2) | 15% 0.2 mg |
| Niacin (B3) | 42% 6.78 mg |
| Pantothenic acid (B5) | 12% 0.58 mg |
| Vitamin B6 | 16% 0.270 mg |
| Folate (B9) | 15% 61 μg |
| Vitamin E | 6% 0.88 mg |
| Vitamin K | 0% 0 μg |
| Minerals | Quantity %DV^{†} |
| Calcium | 7% 93 mg |
| Iron | 17% 3 mg |
| Magnesium | 15% 62 mg |
| Manganese | 54% 1.25 mg |
| Phosphorus | 15% 184 mg |
| Potassium | 9% 266 mg |
| Sodium | 18% 409 mg |
| Zinc | 14% 1.57 mg |
- Other constituents: Quantity
- Water: 33 g
- Selenium: 53.7 ug
- Link to USDA Database entry
- ^{†}Percentages estimated using US recommendations for adults, except for potassium, which is estimated based on expert recommendation from the National Academies.

=== Caribbean ===
Roti is eaten widely across the Caribbean, especially in countries with large Indo-Caribbean populations such as Trinidad and Tobago, Guyana, Suriname, and Jamaica. Originally brought to the islands by indentured laborers from the Indian subcontinent, roti has become a popular staple in the culturally rich cuisines of these countries. In the Caribbean, roti is commonly eaten as an accompaniment to various curries and stews. The traditional way of eating roti is to break the roti by hand, using it to sop up sauce and pieces of meat from the curry. However, in the Caribbean, the term roti may refer to both the flatbread (roti) itself and the more popular street food item, in which the roti is folded around a savory filling in the form of a wrap.

The roti wrap is the commercialization of roti and curry together as a fast-food or street-food item in the Caribbean. This wrap form of roti originated in southern Trinidad. It was first created in the mid-1940s by Sackina Karamath, who later founded Hummingbird Roti Shop in San Fernando, Trinidad and Tobago. The wrap was convenient, as the meal could be eaten faster and while on the go, as well as keeping one's hands from getting dirty. In Trinidad and Tobago, various wrapped roti are served, including chicken, conch, goat, beef, and shrimp. Vegetables can also be added including potato, pumpkin, and spinach as well a variety of local condiments, with pepper sauce (hot sauce) and mango chutney being the most popular. The roti wrap quickly gained popularity across the island and spread throughout the rest of the Caribbean. The wrap is now simply referred to as a roti or just roti. The growth in popularity has recently led to referring to the flatbread itself (roti) that surrounds the filling as a "roti skin" or "roti shell", a practice that is now common in both restaurants and commercial companies. Various types of roti are eaten throughout the West Indies. They are most prominently featured in the diets of people in Trinidad and Tobago, Guyana, and Suriname. Caribbean-style roti is primarily made from wheat flour, baking powder, salt, and water, and cooked on a tawa. Certain rotis are also made with ghee or butter.

==== Trinidad and Tobago ====
Roti in Trinidad, Jamaica and the Leeward Islands
| Food | Image | Description |
|---|---|---|
| Sada roti | | This is a plain roti, made of white flour. It is the simplest roti to make, and is the most commonly consumed roti in Trinidad. It is a popular breakfast option there, and is eaten with various curried meat and vegetable dishes. It is a staple food consumed at both breakfast and dinner by Trinidadians. |
| Paratha roti | | A layered roti made with butter, usually ghee (clarified butter). Ghee is rubbed on both sides, then it is cooked on a tawa (a round, flat metal griddle used in Indian and Pakistani cooking). This gives the roti a crisp exterior and small patches of light browning. When the roti is almost finished cooking, the cook beats the roti while it is on the tawa, causing it to become light and flaky. Paratha roti has a more intense and buttery flavor than plain roti. Paratha is eaten with almost any accompaniment. As with other rotis, it is commonly eaten with curries and stews. It is also traditionally eaten with fried eggs or egg dishes and a cup of tea. In Trinidad, parathas are colloquially called "buss-up shut" ("busted-up shirt") because the roti resembles a tattered and torn-up shirt. |
| Puri | | This is a roti where two layers are rolled out together and cooked (after rolled it's fried directly in hot oil. Some like to first half-cook it on a tawa and then fry (because the puri then soaks up less oil) in the kadhai. This type of roti is eaten with a special halva when a child is born and in the mrityubhoj(tehrvi/death ceremony). |
| Dhalpuri | | A roti with a stuffing of ground yellow split peas, cumin (geera), garlic, and black pepper: The split peas are boiled until they are al dente and then ground in a mill. The cumin is toasted until black and also ground. The stuffing is pushed into the roti dough, and sealed. When rolled flat, the filling is distributed within the roti. It is cooked on the tava and rubbed with oil for ease of cooking. This type of roti is most commonly eaten with a variety of curries. It is also the roti of choice for the making of wrap rotis. |
| Wrap roti | | A popular wrap made by folding a combination of meat and vegetable curries inside of a dhalpuri roti: The curry or stew often contains potatoes or chickpeas as a filler as well as the essential meat component, although vegetarian options are common as well. Popular fillings include curried chicken, goat, conch, duck, beef, shrimp, and vegetable. An assortment of optional condiments are also common such as pepper sauce and mango chutney. |
| Aloo puri/potato puri | | A roti similar to a dhalpuri, but with aloo (potato) substituted for the dhal. The aloo is boiled and milled, and spices and seasonings are added before being sealed in the dough. This aloo filling is also used when making aloo pie or aloo choka. |

==== Guyana ====
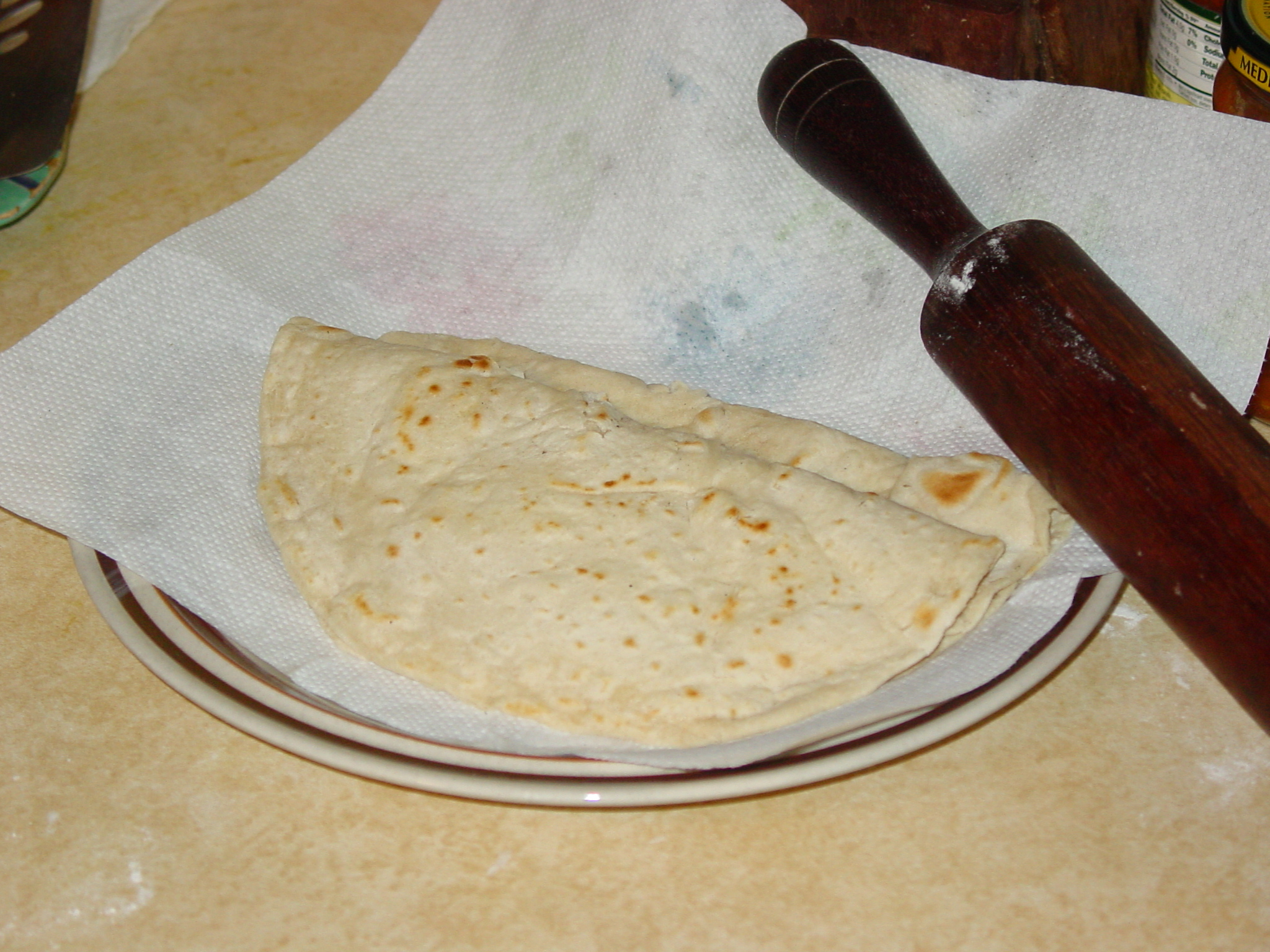
Guyanese roti, clapped and ready to be eaten

Dosti roti is common in Guyana. (Note: "... most Guyanese are unaware that there are different types of roti, which is the staple food in the diet of Indo-Guyanese. ROTI Table 1 shows the differences between eight different types of roti as used by Indo-Guyanese: paratha, dosti, cassava, daalpuri, aluu, chotha, puri and sada.") A small amount of fat is placed in each piece of dough before it is rolled out to make the roti softer. Usually, vegetable oil is used, but butter or margarine can also be used. Ghee is not used in everyday cooking, but is used on special occasions, especially amongst Hindus. The roti is usually clapped by hand or beaten a bit, hot off the tava, so it softens but does not break.

- A good roti in Guyana is very soft, with layers (almost like pastry layers if possible), which remains whole.
- The type of roti is determined by what is placed in the dough before it is rolled out. Various types include dhalpuri, aloo (potato) roti, and sugar.
- In Guyana, a rolled-out, thin, flat dough like a roti that is deep-fried in ghee is called a puri. Therefore, a dhalpuri is not really a puri.
- Another item prepared like roti is bake or bakes or floats. A Guyanese or Trinidadian fry bake seems to be more similar to an Indian puri. A bake is made with butter or margarine and has a different ratio of flour to fat. It is made much more quickly than roti and is usually made in the mornings. Dough is rolled out and cut into shapes or rolled into small rounds. Guyanese bakes are fried, but bakes from other parts of the West Indies can be baked in an oven. Bakes are usually paired with a quick fry-up for breakfast or dinner, stewed saltfish, or eggs ("western" style, with onions, tomatoes, green peppers). Bakes are also made in other parts of the West Indies, including Trinidad, Barbados, and St. Vincent. In Trinidad and Tobago, a "bake and shark" is a popular street-food sandwich in which fried shark is placed between two halves of a sliced bake with local condiments. Pepper sauce, shado beni, garlic sauce, tamarind, and mango chutney are most common, as well as lettuce, tomato, and cucumber for fillers.

==== Suriname ====
In Suriname, roti refers mainly to dhalpuri or aloo puri. It is most often eaten with curried chicken. As in Trinidad and the West Indies, roti can also refer to the stuffed roti wrap. This dish is usually eaten out of hand. Due to a mass emigration of Indian Surinamese in the 1970s, roti became a popular take-out dish in the Netherlands. It usually includes chicken curry, potatoes, a boiled egg, and various vegetables, most notably the kousenband or yardlong bean. Another variation includes shrimp and aubergine. The meat with gravy, potatoes, egg, and yardlong beans are served side by side on a plate, with the aloo puri folded in fours on top.

=== Southeast Asia ===
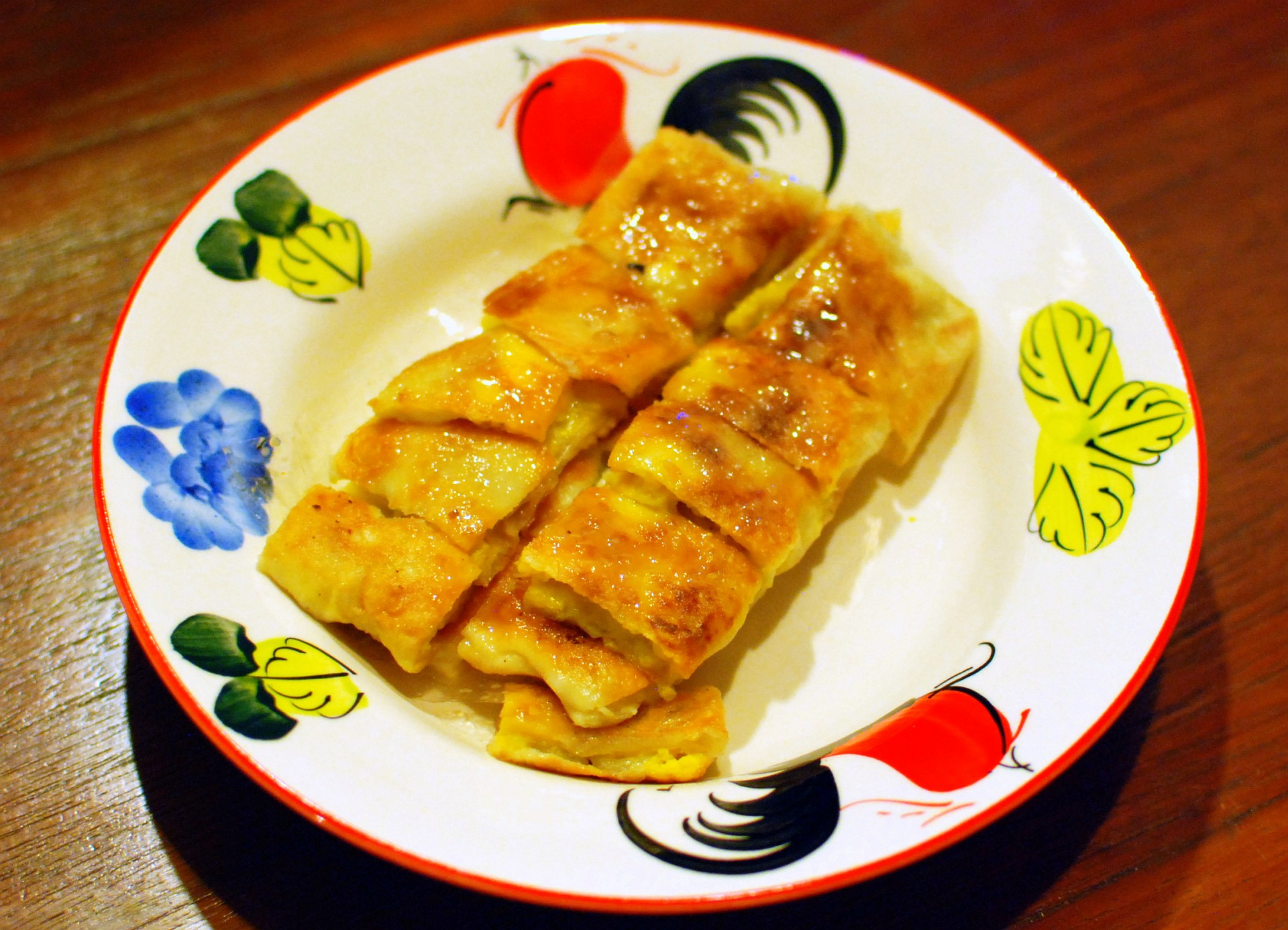
A Thai "โรตีกล้วยไข่ /rɒtiː klûaj kʰàj/": roti with banana and egg, drizzled with sweetened condensed milk

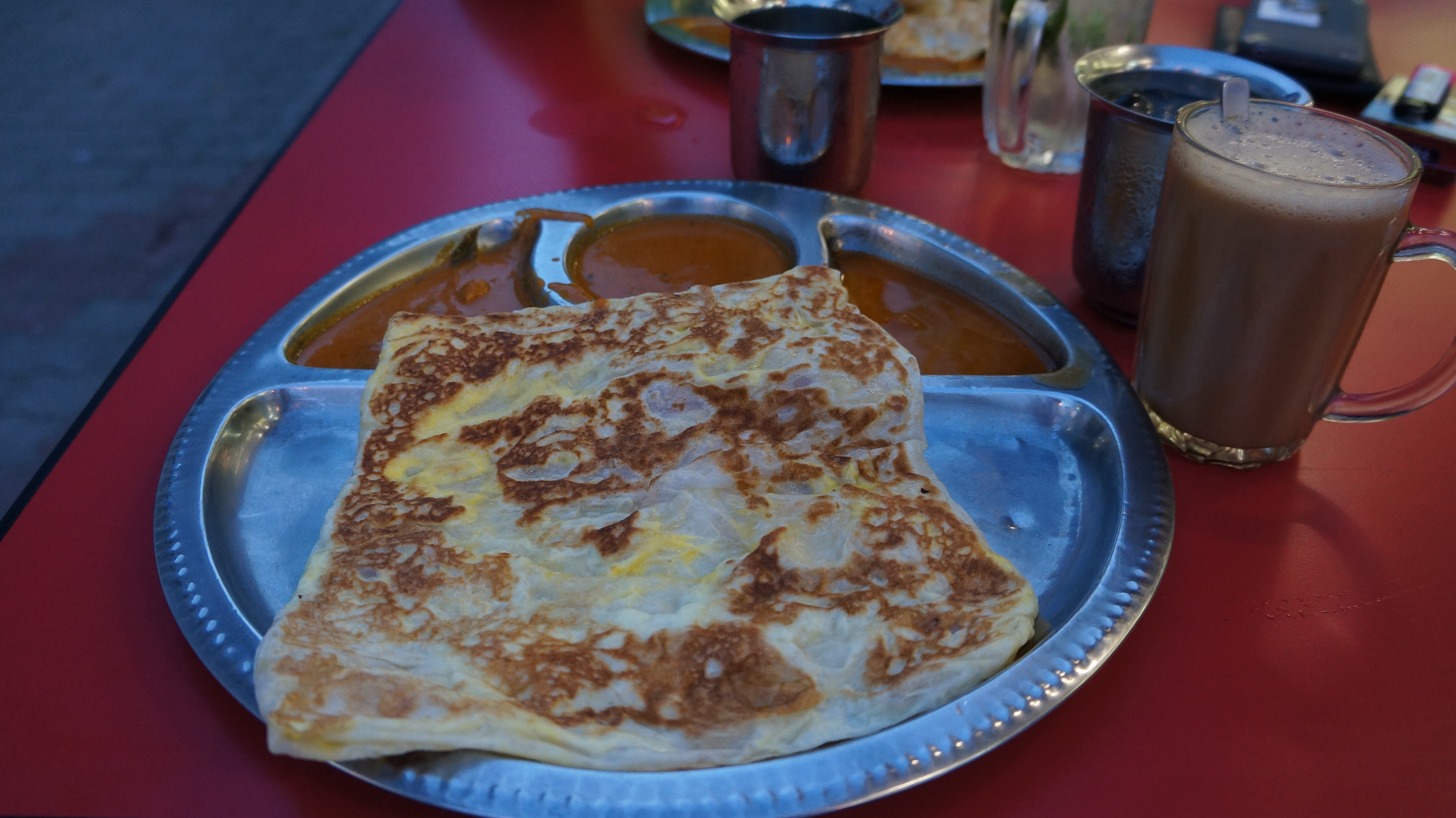
Roti telur and teh tarik in Malaysia

In Indonesia and Malaysia, the term encompasses all forms of bread besides the traditional Indian breads (like roti canai) including Western-style bread (like roti john), as well as bing of the Chinese. A well-known type of Western-style bread in Malaysia under the roti moniker is the fluffy roti benggali commonly served with curries, soups and soft boiled eggs.

In Thailand, โรตี is a popular street food that can be eaten as a dessert or as a side dish. Some Thai curries can also be accompanied with a side of roti, primarily Southern Thai curries.

In Cambodia, រ៉ូទី is a dessert that is sold as street food. It is similar to both a crêpe and paratha.

=== South Africa ===
Roti was initially introduced to South Africa by Indian migrants during the 19th century, and subsequently became incorporated into Durban cuisine. It is widely eaten by the Indian communities living in South Africa, and is either eaten as a flat bread or a wrap with locally made curries.

Roti is also often eaten in Cape Coloured and Cape Malay Communities. Two types of roti are eaten: chapati/flat roti and paratha/flaky roti. Flaky roti is also called Malay roti. When eaten with a curry filling, usually mutton, chicken or mince, the roti is called a Salomie. A roti gatsby is a popular takeaway dish where the bread of the filled gatsby, a popular sandwich is replaced several rotis and folded.

=== Mauritius ===
Similarly as with other countries that were part of the Indian diaspora, roti was introduced to Mauritius by Indian migrants/indentured labourers during the 19th century, and has since been a staple of Mauritian cuisine and a common street food. Roti generally refers to farata (a local pronunciation of paratha), a pancake made of wheat flour and water; other variants include dholl puri, which is layered, and stuffed with boiled and ground dal/split peas, and ti puri, a smaller roti that is fried and usually served with seven different curries.

=== Iran ===
In Iran, the two variants of roti are called khaboos and lavash. These two breads (the former of which is almost exactly prepared like Indian roti) are quite similar to other rotis.

=== Elsewhere ===
Roti shops are now abundant in Trinidad and Tobago, Guyana, Suriname, Jamaica, the United States, Canada, the United Kingdom, and the Netherlands. Owing to Canada's considerable immigrant populations from both South Asia and the Caribbean, roti and its variants are popular there. As Indo-Caribbean people moved to North American cities such as Toronto, New York City, Miami, Los Angeles, and Montreal, they exported with them the wrapped version of roti. A distinct Toronto offering is the "East Indian roti", a variation on the stuffed roti from the West Indies. In some of these cultures, rotis are also being used in the place of pita bread when making burritos, quesadillas, or any other kinds of wraps.

== See also ==
- Bhatura
- Jolada rotti
- Kulcha
- Luchi
- Tortilla
