= Parat =

Type of plate

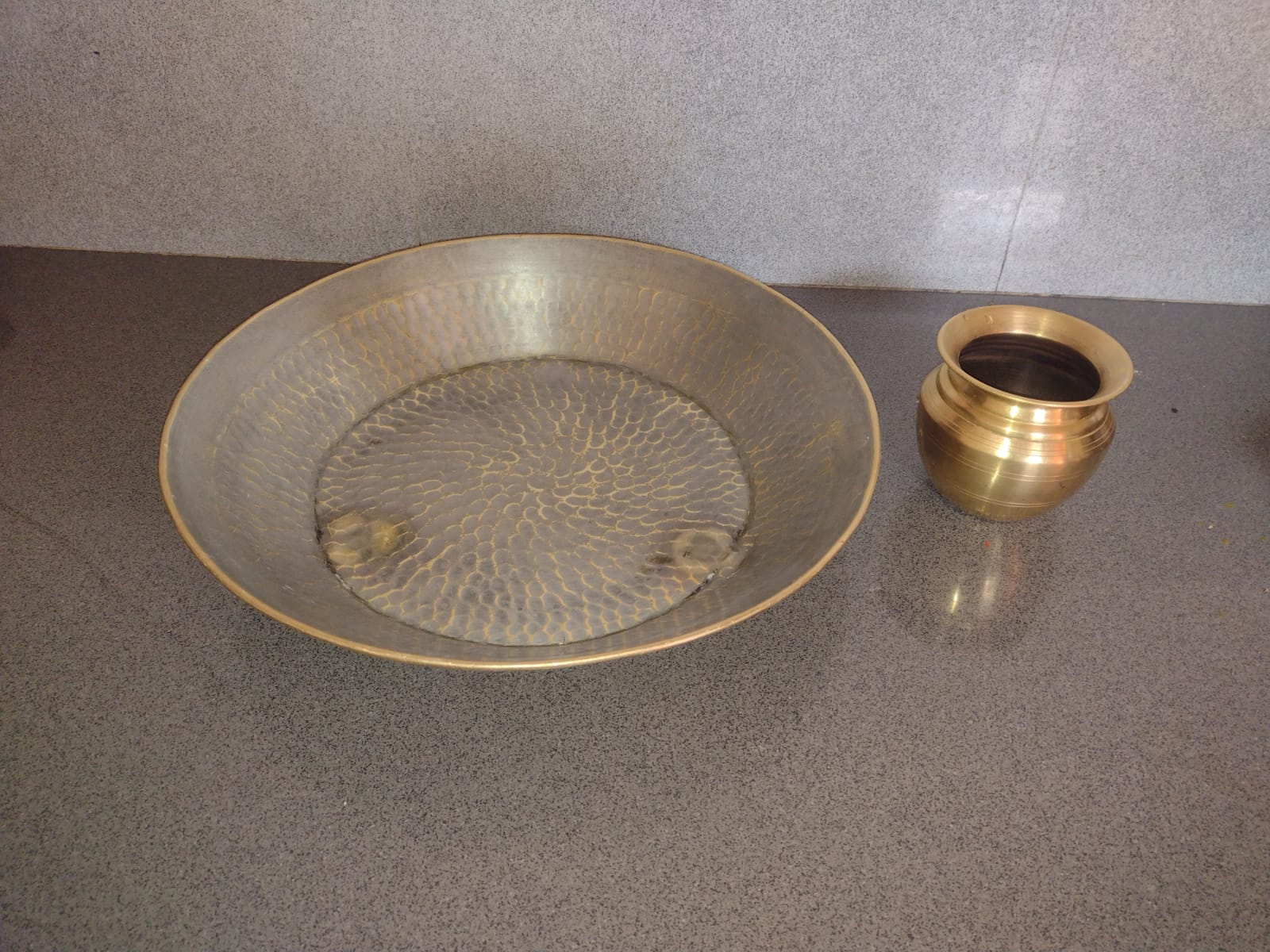
Brass Parat

Parat is a large flat plate used to mix the ingredients for kneading dough to cook chapati, mostly in Indian subcontinent. The plate used is mostly made of brass or steel but cheaper version made of aluminum are also commonplace. Atta also called wheat flour which is the main ingredient for the mixture is mixed with water, oil or ghee and optional salt and is made into a dough.
