= Indian indenture system =

System of indentured servitude using Indian labourers to replace slavery (1800s to 1920s)

The Indian indenture system was a system of indentured servitude, by which more than 1.6 million workers from India were transported to labour in various overseas European colonies, beginning shortly after the abolition of slavery in the early 19th century. Although described by colonial authorities as "free" migration, many recruits were deceived, coerced, or kidnapped, leading historians such as Hugh Tinker to characterise the system as a "new form of slavery". The system began with the Atlas voyage to Mauritius in 1834, but early journeys were marked by mortality rates of over 17%, prompting British authorities to impose stricter shipping regulations. The system expanded after the abolition of slavery in the British Empire in 1833, in the French colonies in 1848, and in the Dutch Empire in 1863. British Indian indentureship lasted until the 1920s. This resulted in the development of a large Indian diaspora in the Caribbean, Natal (South Africa), Réunion, Mauritius, and Fiji, as well as the growth of Indo-South African, Indo-Caribbean, Indo-Mauritian and Indo-Fijian populations. While many descendants celebrate their cultural resilience, historians emphasise the trauma and displacement caused by the indenture system.

Sri Lanka, Singapore, Malaysia, and Myanmar had a similar system, known as the Kangani system. Indo-Lankan Tamil, Indo-Malaysian, Indo-Burmese and Indo-Singaporean populations are largely descended from these Kangani labourers. Similarly, Indo-East African are descended from labourers who went primarily to work on the Kenya-Uganda Railway, although they were not part of the indentured labourer system.

== Origins and early development ==
=== First indenture ===
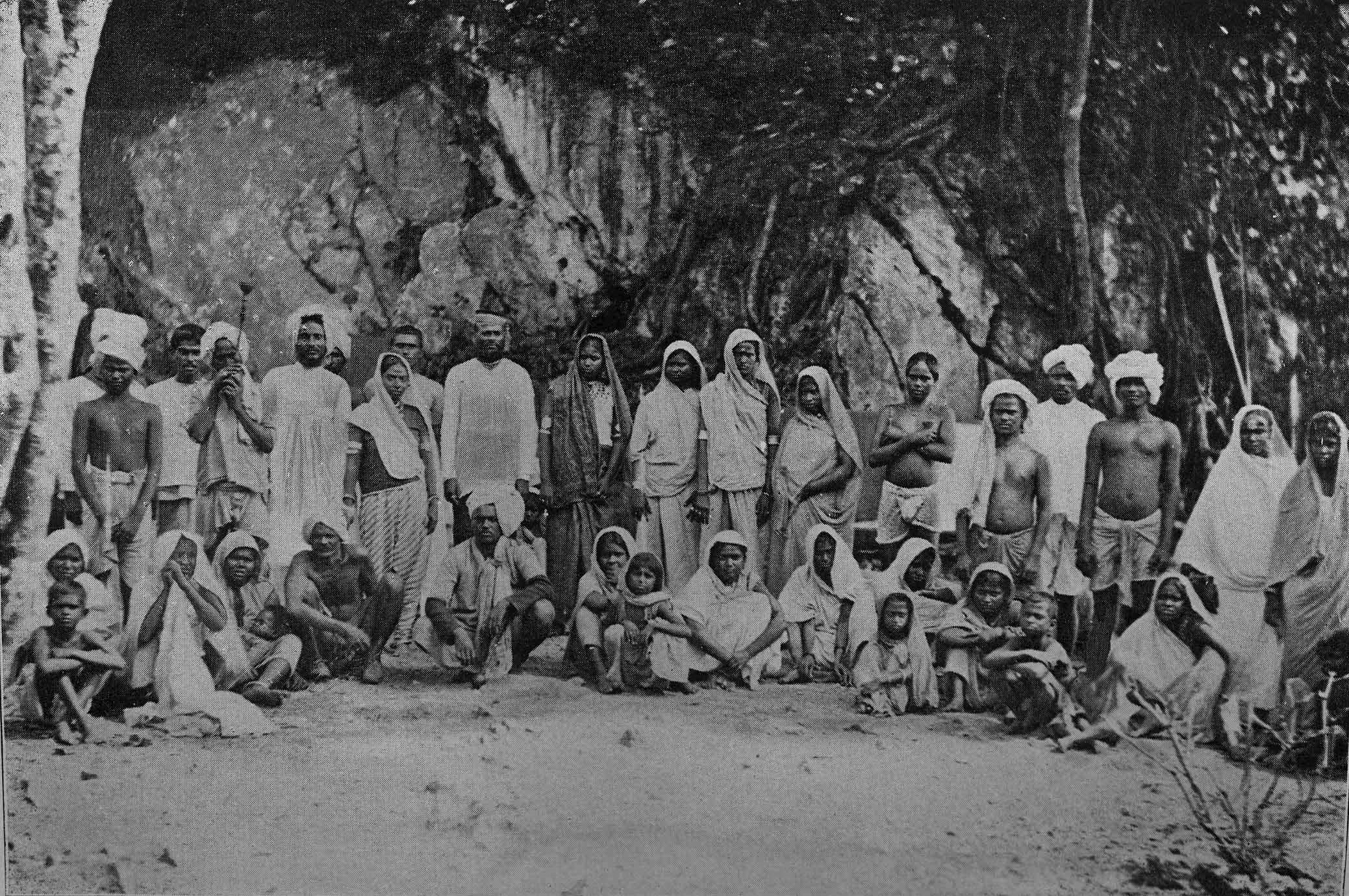
Newly arrived indentured labourers from India in Trinidad, c. 1897

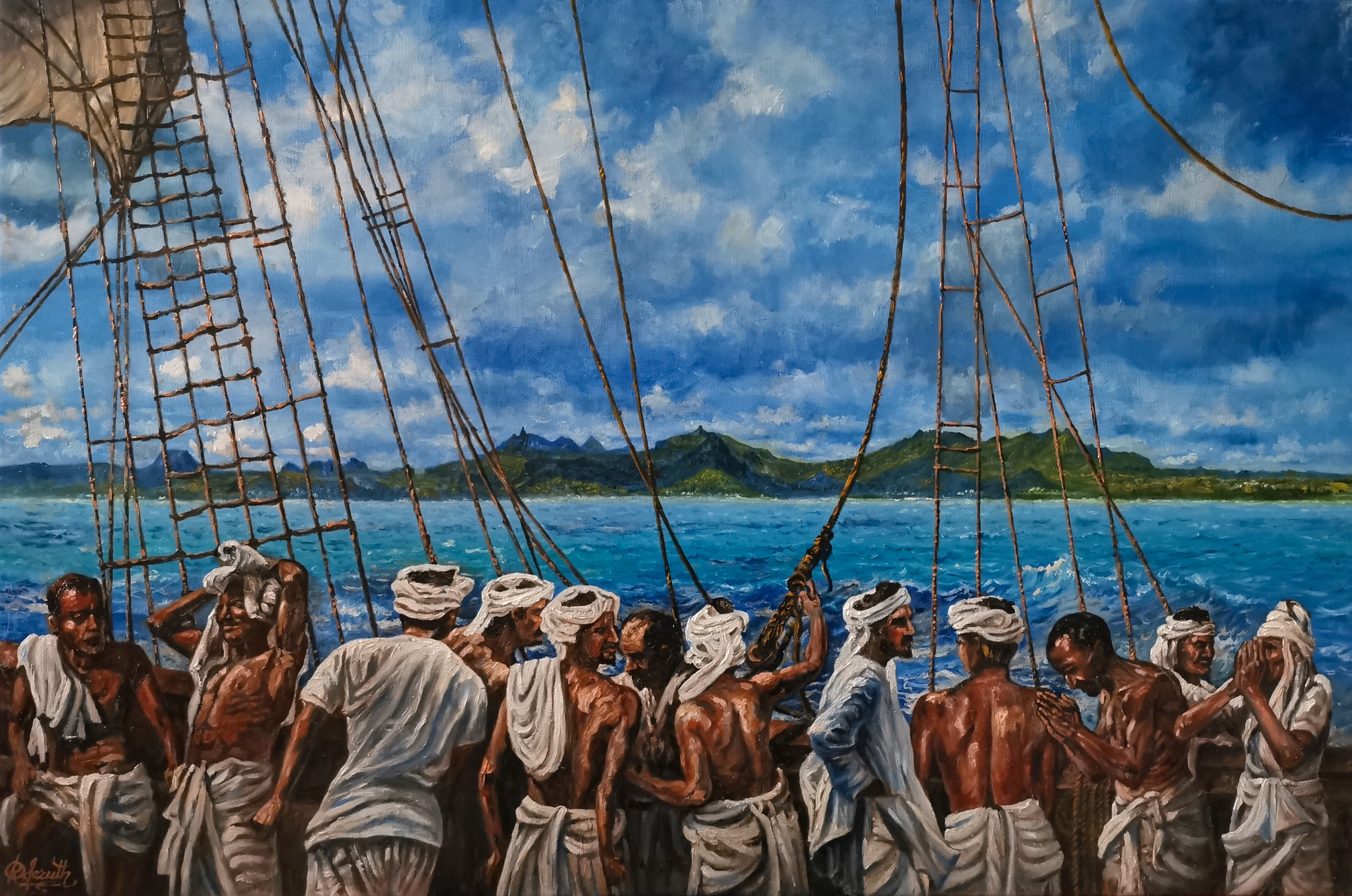
Artistic representation of the first Indian workers seeing the island of Mauritius from a ship in 1834

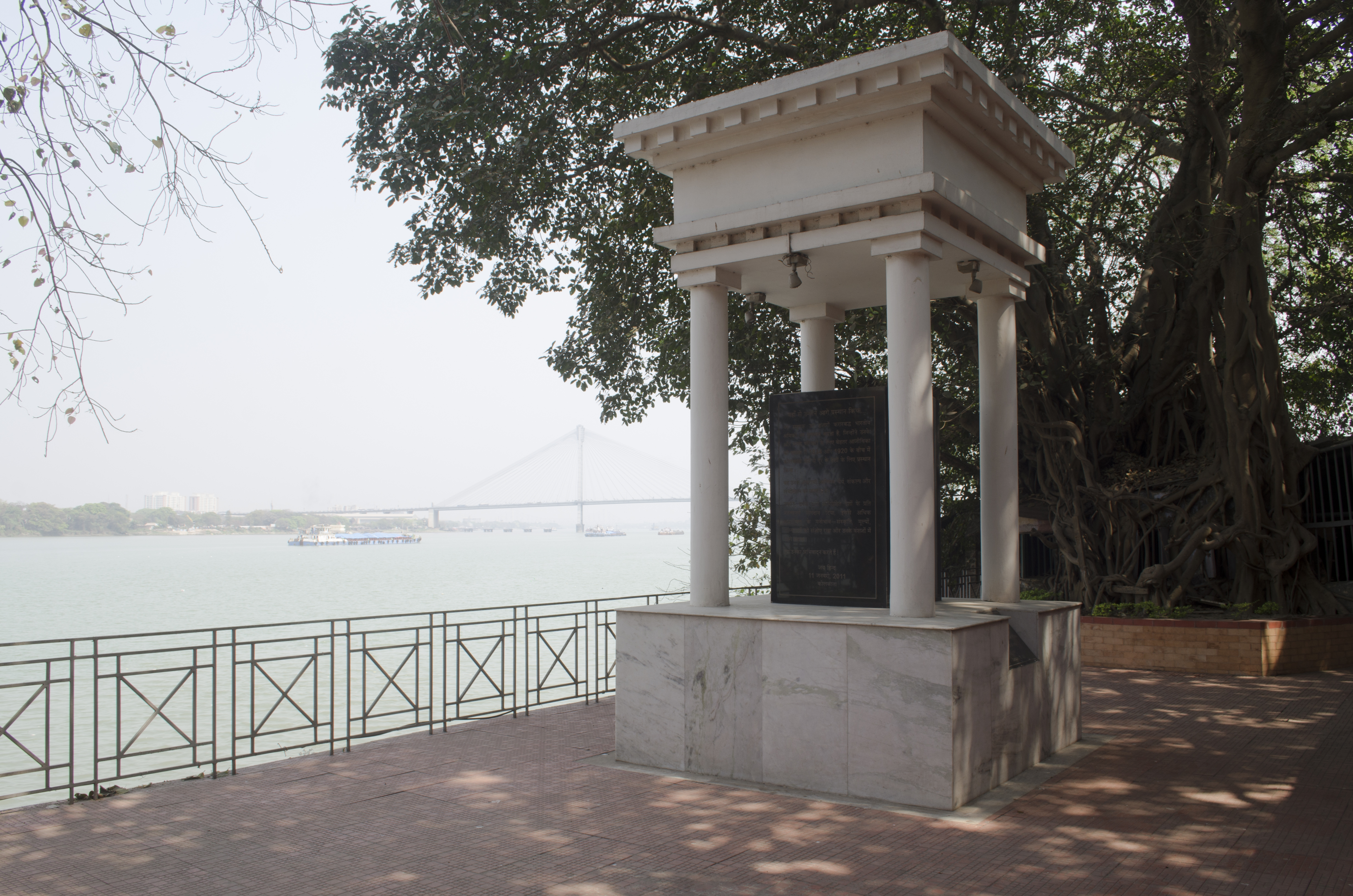
Indenture Memorial, Kidderpore, Kolkata

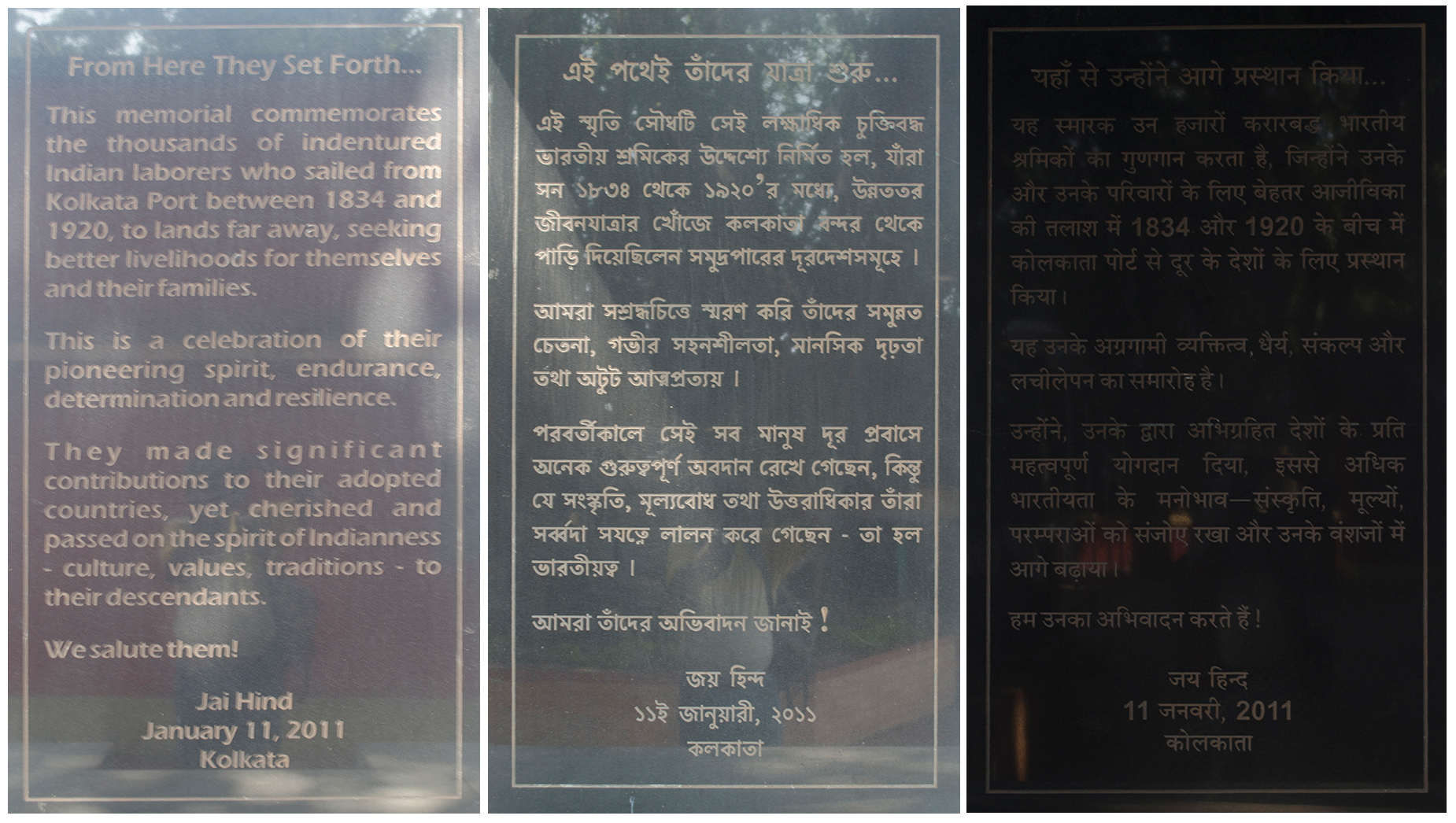
Plaques of Indenture Memorial, Kidderpore, Kolkata

On 18 January 1826, the Government of the French Indian Ocean island of Réunion laid down terms for the introduction of Indian labourers to the colony. Colonial regulations required each laborer to appear before a magistrate and declare that they were migrating voluntarily. However, historians have shown this was often a formality rather than genuine consent. Many migrants were misled by false promises of prosperity or were kidnapped outright by recruiters. Hugh Tinker argues that the supposed voluntariness was a legal fiction, as extreme poverty and systemic coercion left workers with little real choice. Women were especially vulnerable: Bahadur documents widespread sexual coercion during recruitment and voyages, which discouraged families from allowing women to migrate, creating a severe gender imbalance. This agreement is known as girmit and it outlined a period of five years labour in the colonies with pay of 8 rupees per month (about $4 in 1826) and rations, provided labourers had been transported from Pondicherry and Karaikal.

The first organized transport of Indian labourers took place in Mauritius. In 1834, the ship Atlas departed Calcutta with 36 Indian labourers under a trial scheme. This experiment was deemed successful, and within four years over 25,000 labourers had been shipped to the island to work primarily on sugar plantations. Early voyages were extremely hazardous. On some ships, mortality rates exceeded 17%, largely due to cholera, dysentery, overcrowding, and poor rations. Frequent outbreaks of disease and cases of suicide among labourers generated public outcry in Britain and India. In response, the colonial government imposed new shipping regulations, requiring medical officers on board and minimum space standards for passengers. These changes laid the foundation for a standardized indenture system that was later exported to the Caribbean, where the first ships carrying Indian labourers arrived in British Guiana and Trinidad in 1838. The Indian indenture system was put in place initially at the behest of sugar planters in colonial territories, who hoped the system would provide reliable cheap labour similar to the conditions under slavery. The new system was expected to demonstrate the superiority of "free" over slave labour in the production of tropical products for imperial markets.

=== Government of British India regulations ===
The East India Company's Regulations of 1837 laid down specific conditions for the dispatch of Indian labour from Calcutta. The would-be emigrant and his emigration agent were required to appear before an officer designated by the Government of British India, with a written statement of the terms of the contract. The length of service was to be exactly five years, renewable for further five-year terms. The emigrant was to be returned at the end of his service to the port of departure. Each emigrant vessel was required to conform to certain standards of space, diet etc. and to carry a medical officer. In 1837 this scheme was extended to Madras.

=== Ban on export of Indian labour ===
As soon as the new system of emigration of labour became known, a campaign similar to the anti-slavery campaign sprang up in Britain and British India. On 1 August 1838, a committee was appointed to inquire into the export of Indian labour. It heard reports of abuses of the new system. On 29 May 1839, overseas manual labour was prohibited and any person effecting such emigration was liable to a 200 Rupee fine or three months in jail. After prohibition, a few Indian labourers continued to be sent Mauritius via Pondicherry (a French enclave in South India). However, immigration was authorised again in 1842 to Mauritius, and in 1845 to the West Indies.

Further suspensions of Indian immigration happened during the 19th century. For example, between 1848 and 1851 Indian immigration was stopped towards British Guiana because of the economic and political unrest due to the Sugar Duties Act 1846.

=== Resumption of Indian labour transportation ===
European planters in Mauritius and the Caribbean worked hard to overturn the ban, while the anti-slavery committee worked just as hard to uphold it. The Government of the East India Company finally capitulated under intense pressure from European planters and their supporters: On 2 December 1842, the British Government permitted emigration from Calcutta, Bombay, and Madras to Mauritius. Emigration Agents were appointed at each departure point. There were penalties for abuse of the system. Return passage had to be provided at any time after five years when claimed. After the lifting of the ban, the first ship left Calcutta for Mauritius on 23 January 1843. The Protector of the Immigrants in Mauritius reported that a ship arrived every few days with a human consignment and a large number of immigrants were causing a backlog in processing and he asked for help. During 1843, 30,218 male and 4,307 female indentured immigrants entered Mauritius. The first ship from Madras arrived in Mauritius on 21 April 1843.

=== Attempts to stamp out abuses of the system ===
The existing regulations failed to stamp out abuses of the system, which continued, including recruitment by false pretences and consequently, in 1843 the Government of Bengal, was forced to restrict emigration from Calcutta, only permitting departure after the signing of a certificate from the Agent and countersigned by the Protector. Migration to Mauritius continued, with 9,709 male unskilled labourers (Dhangars), and 1,840 female wives and daughters transported in 1844.

The repatriation of Indians who had completed indenture remained a problem with a high death rate and investigations revealed that regulations for the return voyages were not being satisfactorily followed.

Without enough recruits from Calcutta to satisfy the demands of European planters in Mauritius, permission was granted in 1847 to reopen emigration from Madras with the first ship leaving Madras for Mauritius in 1850.

There were also Company officials stationed in colonies that hosted Indian immigrants. For example, when the Danish plantation owners began recruiting Indians, the British representative – also considered a consul – to the Danish West Indies was called the Protector of Immigrants. This official oversaw the welfare of the workers and ensured that the terms of the agreement they signed were implemented.

== Expansion Across the British Empire ==
=== Indian labour transportation to the Caribbean ===
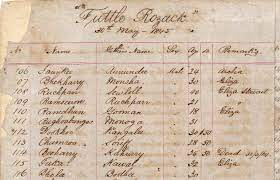
General Register of Fatel Razack, the first ship to bring Indian indentured labours to Trinidad. As per immigration records, 225 immigrants were aboard the ship.

After the end of slavery, the European-led West Indian sugar colonies tried the use of emancipated slaves, families from Ireland, Germany and Malta and Portuguese from Madeira. All these efforts failed to satisfy the labour needs of the colonies due to high mortality of the new arrivals and their reluctance to continue working at the end of their indenture. On 16 November 1844, the British Indian Government legalised emigration to Jamaica, Trinidad and Demerara (Guyana). The first ship, the Whitby, sailed from Port Calcutta for British Guiana on 13 January 1838, and arrived in Berbice on 5 May 1838. Transportation to the Caribbean stopped in 1848 due to problems in the sugar industry and resumed in Demerara and Trinidad in 1851 and Jamaica in 1860.

Importing indentured labour became viable for plantation owners because newly emancipated slaves refused to work for low wages. This is demonstrated in the sheer number of freed slaves in colonies that imported Indian workers. Jamaica had 322,000 while British Guiana and Barbados had about 90,000 and 82,000 freed slaves, respectively. There was also a political incentive to the British import of foreign workers. The influx of Indian workers diminished the competitive leverage and bargaining power of the freed slaves, marginalizing their position within the so-called plantocracy system persisting in the British colonies.

=== Persuading labourers to prolong their indenture ===
==== Renouncing claim to free passage ====
The European planters pressed consistently for longer indentures. In an effort to persuade labourers to stay on, the Mauritius Government, in 1847, offered a gratuity of £2 to each labourer who decided to remain in Mauritius and renounce his claim to a free passage. The Mauritius Government also wanted to discontinue the return passage and finally on 3 August 1852, the Government of British India agreed to change the conditions whereby if a passage was not claimed within six months of entitlement, it would be forfeited, but with safeguards for the sick and poor. A further change in 1852 stipulated that labourers could return after five years (contributing $35 towards the return passage) but would qualify for a free return passage after 10 years. This had a negative effect on recruitment as few wanted to sign up for 10 years and a sum of $35 was prohibitive; the change was discontinued after 1858.

==== Increasing proportion of women ====
It was also considered that if the indentured labourers had a family life in the colonies they would be more likely to stay on. The proportion of women in early migration to Mauritius was small and the first effort to correct this imbalance was when, on 18 March 1856, the Secretary for the Colonies sent a dispatch to the Governor of Demerara that stated that for the season 1856–7 women must form 25 percent of the total. It was more difficult to induce women from North India to go overseas than those from South India but the Colonial Office persisted and on 30 July 1868 instructions were issued that the proportion of 40 women to 100 men should be adhered to. It remained in force of the rest of the indenture period.

==== Land grants ====
Trinidad followed a different trend where the Government offered the labourers a stake in the colony by providing real inducements to settle when their indentures had expired. From 1851 £10 was paid to all those who forfeited their return passages. This was replaced by a land grant and in 1873 further incentives were provided in the form of 5 acres (20,000 m^{2}) of land plus £5 cash. Furthermore, Trinidad adopted an ordinance in 1870 by which new immigrants were not allotted to plantations where the death rate exceeded 7 percent.

=== Indenture to other parts of the British Empire ===
Following introduction of labour laws acceptable to the British Government of India, indenture was extended to the smaller British Caribbean islands; Grenada in 1856, St Lucia in 1858 and St Kitts and St Vincent in 1860. Emigration to Natal was approved on 7 August 1860, and the first ship from Madras arrived in Durban on 16 November 1860, forming the basis of the Indian South African community. The recruits were employed on three-year contracts. The British Government permitted transportation to the Danish colonies in 1862. There was a high mortality rate in the one ship load sent to St Croix, and following adverse reports from the British Consul on the treatment of indentured labourers, further emigration was stopped. The survivors returned to India in 1868, leaving about eighty Indians behind. Permission was granted for emigration to Queensland in 1864, but no Indians were transported under the indenture system to this part of Australia.

=== Streamlining the indentured labour system of British India ===
There were a lot of discrepancies between systems used for indentured Colonial British Indian labour to various colonies. Colonial British Government regulations of 1864 made general provisions for recruitment of Indian labour in an attempt to minimise abuse of the system. These included the appearance of the recruit before a magistrate in the district of recruitment and not the port of embarkation, licensing of recruiters and penalties to recruiters for not observing rules for recruitment, legally defined rules for the Protector of Emigrants, rules for the depots, payment for agents to be by salary and not commission, the treatment of emigrants on board ships and the proportion of females to males were set uniformly to 25 females to 100 males. Despite this the sugar colonies were able to devise labour laws that were disadvantageous to the immigrants. For example, in Demerara an ordinance in 1864 made it a crime for a labourer to be absent from work, misbehaving or not completing five tasks each week. New labour laws in Mauritius in 1867 made it impossible for time-expired labourers to shake free of the estate economy. They were required to carry passes, which showed their occupation and district and anyone found outside his district was liable to arrest and dispatched Immigration Depot. If he was found to be without employment he was deemed a vagrant.

=== Transportation to Suriname ===
Transportation of Indian labour to Suriname began under an agreement that has been declared as Imperial. In return for Dutch rights to recruit Indian labour, the Dutch transferred some old forts (remnants of slave trade) in West Africa to the British and also bargained for an end to British claims in Sumatra. Labourers were signed up for five years and were provided with a return passage at the end of this term, but were to be subject to Dutch law. The first ship carrying Indian indentured labourers arrived in Suriname in June 1873 followed by six more ships during the same year.

=== British transportation of Indian labour, 1842 to 1870 ===
Following the abolition of slavery throughout the British Empire, it was again abolished in the French colonial empire in 1848, and the U.S. abolished slavery in 1865 with the 13th Amendment to the U.S. Constitution.

Between 1842 and 1870 a total of 525,482 Indians emigrated to the British and French Colonies. Of these, 351,401 went to Mauritius, 76,691 went to Demerara, 42,519 went to Trinidad, 15,169 went to Jamaica, 6,448 went to Natal, 15,005 went to Réunion and 16,341 went to the other French colonies. This figure does not include the 30,000 who went to Mauritius earlier, labourers who went to Ceylon or Malaya and illegal recruitment to the French colonies. Thus by 1870 the indenture system, transporting Indian labour to the colonies, was an established system of providing labour for European colonial plantations and when, in 1879, Fiji became a recipient of Indian labour it was this same system with a few minor modifications.

=== Recruitment for other European colonies ===
The success of the Indian indenture system for the British, despite its terrible human cost, did not go unnoticed by other colonial powers. French sugar colonies began recruiting Indian labourers via French-controlled ports in India, initially without the knowledge of British authorities. By 1856, the number of Indian workers in Réunion was estimated at 37,694. On 25 July 1860, Britain officially permitted France to recruit labourers for Réunion at a rate of 6,000 annually, and this was extended on 1 July 1861 to allow recruitment for Martinique, Guadeloupe, and French Guiana (Cayenne). French contracts were for five years, with return passage provided at the end of the indenture period (in contrast to the ten-year requirement in many British colonies). The Governor-General retained the authority to suspend recruitment if abuses were detected in the system.

Inspired by this model, other colonial powers also sought Indian labourers. From 1873, the Dutch began transporting Indian workers to Suriname, where they signed five-year contracts governed by Dutch law but similar in structure to British agreements. In the Danish West Indies, planters briefly imported Indian labourers to St. Croix, but the system was abandoned after high mortality rates among the workers.

== Living and working conditions of labourers ==
=== The Indenture Agreement ===
The following is the indenture agreement of 1912:

1. Period of Service-Five Years from the Date of Arrival in the Colony.
2. Nature of labour-Work in connection with the Cultivation of the soil or the manufacture of the produce on any plantation.
3. Number of days on which the Emigrant is required to labour in each Week-Every day, excepting Sundays and authorized holidays.
4. Number of hours in every day during which he is required to labour without extra remuneration-Nine hours on each of five consecutive days in every week commencing with the Monday of each week, and five hours on the Saturday of each week.
5. Monthly or Daily Wages and Task-Work Rates-When employed at time-work every adult male Emigrant above the age of fifteen years will be paid not less than one shilling, which is at present equivalent to twelve annas and every adult female Emigrant above that age not less than nine pence, which is at present equivalent to nine annas, for every working day of nine hours; children below that age will receive wages proportionate to the amount of work done.
6. When employed at task or ticca-work every adult male Emigrant above the age of fifteen years will be paid not less than one shilling, and every adult female Emigrant above that age not less than nine pence for every task which shall be performed.
7. The law is that a man's task shall be as much as ordinary able-bodied adult male Emigrant can do in six hours’ steady work, and that a woman's task shall be three-fourths of a man's task. An employer is not bound to allot, nor is an Emigrant bound to perform more than one task in each day, but by mutual agreement such extra work may be allotted, performed and paid for.
8. Wages are paid weekly on the Saturday of each week.
9. Conditions as to return passage-Emigrants may return to India at their own expense after completing five years’ industrial residence in the Colony.
10. After ten years’ continuous residence every Emigrant who was above the age of twelve on introduction to the Colony and who during that period has completed an industrial residence of five years, shall be entitled to a free-return passage if he claims it within two years after the completion of the ten years’ continuous residence. If the Emigrant was under twelve years of age when he was introduced into the colony, he will be entitled to a free return passage if he claims it before he reaches 24 years of age and fulfills the other conditions as to residence. A child of an Emigrant born within the colony will be entitled to a free return passage until he reaches the age of twelve, and must be accompanied on the voyage by his parents or guardian.
11. Other Conditions-Emigrants will receive rations from their employers during the first six months after their arrival on the plantation according to the scale prescribed by the government of Fiji at a daily cost of four pence, which is at present equivalent to four annas, for each person of twelve years of age and upwards.
12. Every child between five and twelve years of age will receive approximately half rations free of cost, and every child, five years of age and under, nine chattacks of milk daily free of cost, during the first year after their arrival.
13. Suitable dwelling will be assigned to Emigrants under indenture free of rent and will be kept in good repair by the employers. When Emigrants under indenture are ill they will be provided with Hospital accommodation, Medical attendance, Medicines, Medical comforts and Food free of charge.
14. An Emigrant who has a wife still living is not allowed to marry another wife in the Colony unless his marriage with his first wife shall have been legally dissolved; but if he is married to more than one wife in his country he can take them all with him to the Colony and they will then be legally registered and acknowledged as his wives.

Once on the plantations, indentured labourers faced gruelling work schedules, harsh discipline, and widespread abuse. Plantation work was physically exhausting, often involving cutting sugar cane, digging irrigation channels, weeding, and transporting heavy loads for 10–12 hours a day, six days a week. Although the indenture contract required a minimum of nine hours of work daily, planters often extended this without extra pay to meet production quotas. Wages were minimal and frequently withheld. A male labourer typically earned one shilling per day, while women received lower wages, usually three-quarters of a man's pay. Employers could also dock wages or impose fines for infractions such as lateness, missing work, or "insubordination". In colonies such as British Guiana, strict labour laws made it a criminal offence to be absent from work or fail to complete a set number of tasks, leading to imprisonment or physical punishment for minor breaches. This system of fines and legal coercion effectively tied workers to the plantation, blurring the line between indenture and slavery.

=== Housing and sanitation ===
Housing provided to indentured labourers was often overcrowded and unsanitary. Workers were usually housed in long barrack-style buildings made of wood or mud, with poor ventilation and no privacy. Each room might contain multiple families, with little furniture beyond mats on the floor. Sanitation facilities were primitive or non-existent, and clean drinking water was rarely available. These conditions contributed to frequent outbreaks of diseases such as cholera, malaria, smallpox, and dysentery. Mortality rates were particularly high during the early decades of the system. In Mauritius, mortality among new arrivals sometimes exceeded 20% annually, especially during the initial acclimatisation period. Epidemics spread rapidly due to cramped quarters and the tropical climate. Malnutrition also contributed to poor health, as rations were meagre and often of poor quality. Workers typically received rice, dhal (lentils), and salt fish, with occasional vegetables or meat. During periods of food shortage, rations were cut, leading to widespread hunger and weakened immunity. Plantation hospitals were theoretically provided free of charge, but in practice they were poorly equipped and understaffed. Many labourers were reluctant to report illnesses, fearing that time spent in hospital would result in lost wages or accusations of malingering. In some cases, sick workers were forced back to work before fully recovering.

=== Discipline and punishment ===
Discipline on plantations was strict and frequently violent. Overseers and managers held near-total authority over the workforce and commonly resorted to whipping, beatings, confinement, or public humiliation to enforce productivity. Colonial records from British Guiana, Trinidad, and Fiji document numerous cases of flogging, imprisonment, and even deaths resulting from excessive punishment. Legal systems in many colonies supported the planters. For instance, in Demerara, an 1864 ordinance criminalised a wide range of worker behaviours, including refusing tasks, "improper conduct", or being outside the plantation without permission. Such laws meant that workers could be arrested and imprisoned for attempting to leave before their contracts expired. These practices led some historians to describe the indenture system as "a new form of slavery", despite its formal legal distinction from chattel slavery.

=== Social impacts ===
Women endured particularly severe hardships under the indenture system. Early voyages often had extremely skewed gender ratios, with as few as one woman for every 40 men on some ships. This imbalance left women vulnerable to sexual exploitation by overseers, colonial officials, and male labourers. Missionary and colonial reports documented widespread cases of rape, coerced relationships, and violence against women who resisted advances. Some women entered relationships voluntarily as a form of protection, but these arrangements were often unstable and exploitative. Families in India were frequently reluctant to allow women to migrate because of these dangers, which perpetuated the gender imbalance. Women were also expected to work alongside men in the fields while maintaining domestic responsibilities, such as child-rearing and cooking, resulting in a double burden of labour.

The harsh conditions of indentured life took a profound psychological toll on labourers. Letters and oral histories describe intense homesickness, cultural dislocation, and feelings of betrayal by recruiters who had promised wealth and opportunity. Some labourers resorted to suicide, especially during the early years of the system, as an act of despair or protest. Despite these hardships, workers found ways to resist and preserve their cultural identity. Acts of resistance included slowdowns, strikes, sabotage, and desertion, though these were often met with harsh reprisals. Labourers also formed informal support networks and maintained cultural practices such as Hindu and Muslim religious observances, festivals, and traditional music. These practices provided a sense of solidarity and laid the foundations for the Indo-Caribbean, Indo-Mauritian, Indo-Fijian, and Indo-South African communities that exist today.

=== Mortality and reform efforts ===
As mortality rates and reports of abuse became public in Britain and India, reformers pushed for greater oversight of the system. From the 1860s onwards, the British government introduced regulations on shipboard conditions, housing standards, and rations. These reforms included requirements for a minimum number of women per ship, inspections by colonial officials, and the appointment of Protectors of Immigrants to monitor welfare. However, enforcement was inconsistent and often undermined by planters and local authorities. Mortality rates declined somewhat by the late 19th century, but conditions remained harsh. Hugh Tinker and other historians argue that these reforms were cosmetic, designed to placate critics while preserving the economic benefits of the system.

== Final ban on indenture system ==
Gopal Krishna Gokhale, a moderate Congress leader, tabled a bill in the Viceroy Legislative Council to end the export of indentured labour to Natal (present day South Africa) in February 1910. The bill passed unanimously and came to effect in July 1911. However, the British-led Indian indenture system for other colonies finally ended in 1917. According to The Economist, "When the Imperial Legislative Council finally ended indenture because of pressure from Indian nationalists and declining profitability, rather than from humanitarian concerns."

== Legacy and cultural impact ==
=== British transportation of Indian indentured labour by colony ===
Indian indentured labour importing colonies
| Name of Colony | Number of Labourers Transported |
|---|---|
| British Mauritius | 453,063 |
| British Guiana | 238,909 |
| Trinidad and Tobago | 147,596 |
| British Jamaica | 36,412 |
| British Malaya | 400,000 |
| British Grenada | 3,200 |
| British Saint Lucia | 4,350 |
| Colony of Natal | 152,184 |
| Saint Kitts | 337 |
| Nevis | 315 |
| Saint Vincent | 2,472 |
| Réunion | 120,507 |
| Dutch Surinam | 34,304 |
| Colony of Fiji | 60,965 |
| East Africa Protectorate | 32,000 |
| British Seychelles | 6,315 |
| British Singapore | 3,000 |
| Danish West Indies | 321 |
| Total | 1,601,935 |

=== Culture ===
Indo-Caribbean writers have had a strong impact on the literature of the region. In Guyana Indo-Guyanese writers have had a strong impact on the literature of Guyana. Notable writers of Indian descent include Rohit Jagessar, Joseph Rahomon and Shana Yardan. Nobel laureate V.S. Naipaul is of Indo-Trinidadian and Tobagonian origin and his literary works are a reflection of his origin.

Some of the traditional Indian games (such as kabaddi and kho-kho) became established in South Africa and parts of Asia.

=== Demographical impact ===
Several countries experienced demographic changes due to this migration.

- Majority or biggest group:
  1. Mauritians of Indian origin: 66.00% Demographics of Mauritius
  2. Indo-Guyanese: 39.83% Demographics of Guyana
  3. Indo-Trinidadians and Tobagonians: 35.43% Demographics of Trinidad and Tobago
  4. Indo-Surinamese: 27.40% Demographics of Suriname
- Second largest group:
  1. Indo-Fijians: 37.50% Demographics of Fiji
  2. Indo-Grenadians: 11% Demographics of Grenada
  3. Indo-Martiniquais: 10% Demographics of Martinique
- Significant minority:
  1. Indian Singaporeans: 9.00% Demographics of Singapore
  2. Malaysian Indians: 7.00% Demographics of Malaysia
  3. Indian South Africans: 2.60% Demographics of South Africa
  4. Indian Tamils of Sri Lanka: 4.2% Demographics of Sri Lanka
- Others including significant minority in past or economically strong minority:
  1. Indians in Uganda
  2. Burmese Indians
  3. Indians in French Guiana
  4. Réunionnais of Indian origin
  5. Indo-Caribbean people
  6. Kenyan Asians
  7. Indo-Seychellois
  8. Indians in Tanzania

== See also ==
- Coolie
- Commonwealth diaspora
- Inland Emigration Act of 1859
- Surinaam Ghat
- Global Girmit Museum
- Ibis trilogy

== Bibliography ==
- Sen, Sunanda. "Indentured Labour from India in the Age of Empire." Social Scientist 44.1/2 (2016): 35–74. online
- Tinker, H. A New System of Slavery: The Export of Indian Labour Overseas 1820–1920, Oxford University Press, London, 1974
- Lal, B.V. Girmitiyas: The Origins of the Fiji Indians, Fiji Institute of Applied Studies, Lautoka, Fiji, 2004
- Gaiutra Bahadur, Coolie Woman: The Odyssey of Indenture. The University of Chicago (2014) ISBN 978-0-226-21138-1
- de Verteuil, Anthony. 1989. Eight East Indian Immigrants: Gokool, Soodeen, Sookoo, Capildeo, Beccani, Ruknaddeen, Valiama, Bunsee ISBN 976-8054-25-5
- Autobiography of an Indian Indetured Labourer. Munshi Rahman Khan (1874–1972). Shipra Publications, Delhi, 2005. ISBN 81-7541-243-7.
