= A Message from the Falklands =

Book

A Message from the Falklands: The Life and Gallant Death of David Tinker is a book about Lieutenant David Hugh Russell Tinker (14 March 1957 – 12 June 1982), a Royal Navy supply officer who was killed in action during the Falklands War. His father, Hugh Tinker, published the book after Tinker's death as an edited collection of David's letters and poetry.

== David Tinker ==
Lieutenant David Hugh Russell Tinker (14 March 1957 – 12 June 1982) was a Royal Navy supply officer, appointed as captain's secretary in the County-class destroyer HMS Glamorgan. He was killed in action on 12 June 1982, shortly before the end of the Falklands War, when Glamorgan was hit by an Exocet missile fired from a land based launcher by an Argentine Navy team in Stanley; he was on duty as flight deck officer on the flight deck, aft of the ship, within the helicopter bay, at the time. Twelve other sailors were also killed.

Tinker was born on 14 March 1957, the son of Hugh and Elizabeth Tinker. His father was a writer and university professor. He was educated at St. Paul's C. of E. Primary School and Mill Hill School, where he served as coxswain in the naval section of the school CCF. After training at Dartmouth (Britannia Royal Naval College), he studied at Birmingham University. Tinker was married to Christine Daybell, who still lives in the cottage they bought together in Shropshire.

== Publication ==
Following Tinker's death, his father privately published a book, A Message from the Falklands: The Life and Gallant Death of David Tinker, which contained some of David's letters home, and poems written earlier in his life. The poems are reminiscent of Wilfred Owen's earlier work. The book was taken up first by the Sunday Times, and then by Penguin Books.

It was subsequently adapted by Louise Page as a stage play titled Falkland Sound, which was first performed at the Royal Court Theatre in 1983. The book has also been published in Spanish in Argentina, and in German (as Das kurze Leben des Leutnants zur See David Tinker).
