= Inland Emigration Act, 1859 =

Indian colonial government policy

The Inland Emigration Act, 1859 was a pivotal piece of legislation enacted by the British colonial government in India to regulate the internal migration of laborers to the tea plantations of Assam and other regions. The Act was primarily aimed at securing a steady and controlled supply of labor for the rapidly expanding tea industry in Assam, an area that was newly colonized by the British and largely undeveloped. The Act is widely recognized for its role in institutionalizing the indenture system within India, which led to significant exploitation and harsh conditions for the laborers it governed.

== Background ==
=== The rise of the tea industry in Assam ===
The British Empire's interest in tea cultivation began in the early 19th century, as they sought to reduce their reliance on Chinese tea imports by establishing tea plantations in India. The region of Assam, with its fertile soil and humid climate, was identified as an ideal location for growing tea. However, the nascent tea industry faced a major challenge: a severe shortage of willing and able laborers.

Local Assamese populations were generally resistant to the idea of working on tea plantations due to the grueling conditions and low wages offered. To address this, the British planters began to look for laborers from other parts of India, particularly from areas facing economic hardships such as Bihar, Bengal, and Odisha.

=== Early labor recruitment challenges ===
Initially, the recruitment of laborers for Assam's tea plantations was informal and often unregulated. This lack of oversight led to numerous abuses, including kidnapping, deceit, and coercion by unscrupulous recruiters known as "arkatis." Many laborers were lured with false promises of good wages and working conditions, only to find themselves trapped in a system akin to slavery upon arrival at the plantations. These abuses prompted the British government to introduce more formal legislation to regulate labor migration and protect the interests of planters, culminating in the Inland Emigration Act of 1859.

== Provisions of the Act ==
The Inland Emigration Act of 1859 was comprehensive in its scope, aiming to regulate all aspects of the recruitment, transportation, and employment of laborers:

- Recruitment Regulation: The Act allowed planters and their agents to recruit laborers from various parts of India but required them to obtain a license from district authorities. This was intended to ensure that recruitment was conducted fairly and voluntarily, although in practice, this oversight was minimal.
- Registration and Documentation: Laborers recruited under the Act had to be registered with local authorities, and details of their employment terms were to be documented. This included the length of their contract, wages, and working conditions, although enforcement of these provisions was weak, and many contracts were not honored.
- Contractual Obligations: Recruited laborers were bound by a contract, typically for a period of three to five years, during which they were required to work exclusively for the tea plantation to which they were assigned. This contractual obligation severely restricted their freedom of movement and choice.
- Transportation and Conditions: The Act regulated the transportation of laborers to Assam, stipulating that they should be provided with basic necessities during transit. However, reports of overcrowded and unsanitary conditions on transport routes were common, leading to high mortality rates.
- Penalties for Desertion: To prevent labor shortages, the Act included harsh penalties for desertion. Laborers who attempted to leave the plantations before their contracts expired could be fined, have their wages withheld, or face imprisonment.
- Monitoring and Enforcement: The Act granted broad powers to planters to enforce labor discipline, including the right to impose fines and punishments. Local magistrates often sided with the planters, further disadvantaging the laborers.

== Impact and consequences ==
=== Exploitation and harsh conditions ===
The Inland Emigration Act of 1859 facilitated widespread exploitation of laborers. The Act's provisions, particularly those regarding penalties for desertion and control over laborers' movement, created a system where laborers were effectively bound to the plantations under conditions of near-slavery. Reports from the period detail the dire conditions faced by laborers, including long working hours, inadequate shelter, poor sanitation, and insufficient food.

=== Social and demographic changes ===
The Act also had significant social and demographic impacts. The large-scale migration of laborers to Assam led to substantial changes in the region's population composition, with the introduction of diverse ethnic and cultural groups. This migration also contributed to social tensions and conflicts, particularly as the conditions on plantations deteriorated and the laborers began to resist.

=== Resistance and reform movements ===
The oppressive nature of the Act and the conditions it created led to various forms of resistance among laborers, including strikes, desertions, and even violent uprisings. Social reformers in India and Britain criticized the Act and the broader system of indentured labor, drawing parallels with slavery and calling for better protections for laborers.

=== Amendments and repeal ===
In response to mounting criticism and resistance, the Inland Emigration Act was amended several times in the late 19th and early 20th centuries to improve labor conditions and reduce exploitation. Key amendments included the introduction of better oversight mechanisms and stricter penalties for abusive planters. Despite these amendments, significant abuses continued, and the Act remained a focal point of criticism by Indian nationalists and labor rights activists.

The Act was eventually repealed in 1922, following a sustained campaign by Indian nationalists and labor activists who argued that the system of indentured labor was inherently exploitative and needed to be abolished.

== Legacy ==
The Inland Emigration Act of 1859 is a significant part of India's colonial history, reflecting the broader dynamics of colonial exploitation and control. It exemplifies how colonial policies were designed to benefit British economic interests at the expense of local populations. The Act's legacy includes a greater awareness of the rights of workers and the importance of legal protections against exploitation, which influenced subsequent labor legislation in India and other parts of the British Empire.

== See also ==
- Indian indenture system
- History of Assam
- British Raj

== References And Further Reading ==
- "Tea Plantations and Colonial Rule in India" by Tirthankar Roy
- Labor and the Economy of Assam: 1826-1920" by Amalendu Guha
- "The Colonial Economy and the Beginnings of Modern South Asia" by Indrajit Ray
- Brown, Judith M. Modern India: The Origins of an Asian Democracy. Oxford University Press, 1985.
