= Manda roti =

Extremely thin flatbread from the Indian subcontinent

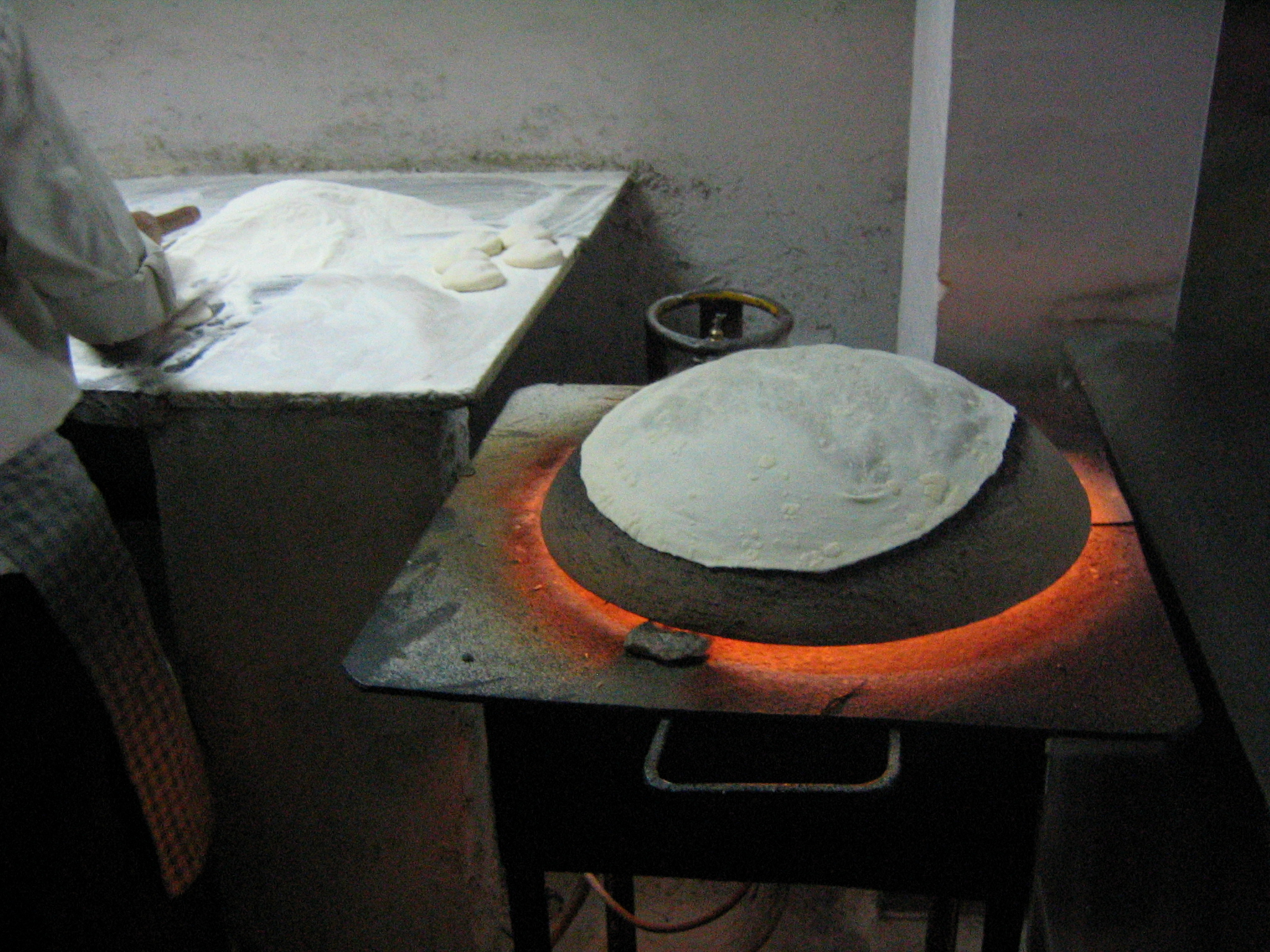
- Manda roti being prepared on an upturned vessel
- Alternative names: Mandige, rumali, or veechu roti
- Place of origin: India
- Associated cuisine: Indian
- Main ingredients: Atta and maida flour

Manda roti (also called rumali roti) is a traditional Indian bread. It can be made with cardamom, ghee, sugar and milk. This roti is extremely thin and limp, and served folded like a handkerchief. Manda roti is usually made with a combination of whole-wheat atta flour and white wheaten maida flour and cooked on the convex side of a kadahi. It is also known as veechu roti in Tamil or mandige in other parts of South India.

== Etymology and history ==
The word manda roti is a compound of two words: manda and roti. The word manda is derived from the Sanskrit word maṇḍaka and roti from the Sanskrit word roṭikā. Maṇḍaka is a wheat-based flatbread mentioned in Sanskrit literature from religious scriptures like Skanda purāṇa to Pākakalā texts like Bhojanakutūhala. As per Skanda purāṇa, maṇḍaka are thin circular symmetrical flat cakes prepared from wheat flour. In Bhojanakutūhala, the detailed recipe of maṇḍaka describes that they are cooked on an upturned pot. In Madanapala Nighantu, several varieties of mandakas are mentioned which are prepared by adding vikola, karkaṭa, drākṣā and kantakäri, among other ingredients.

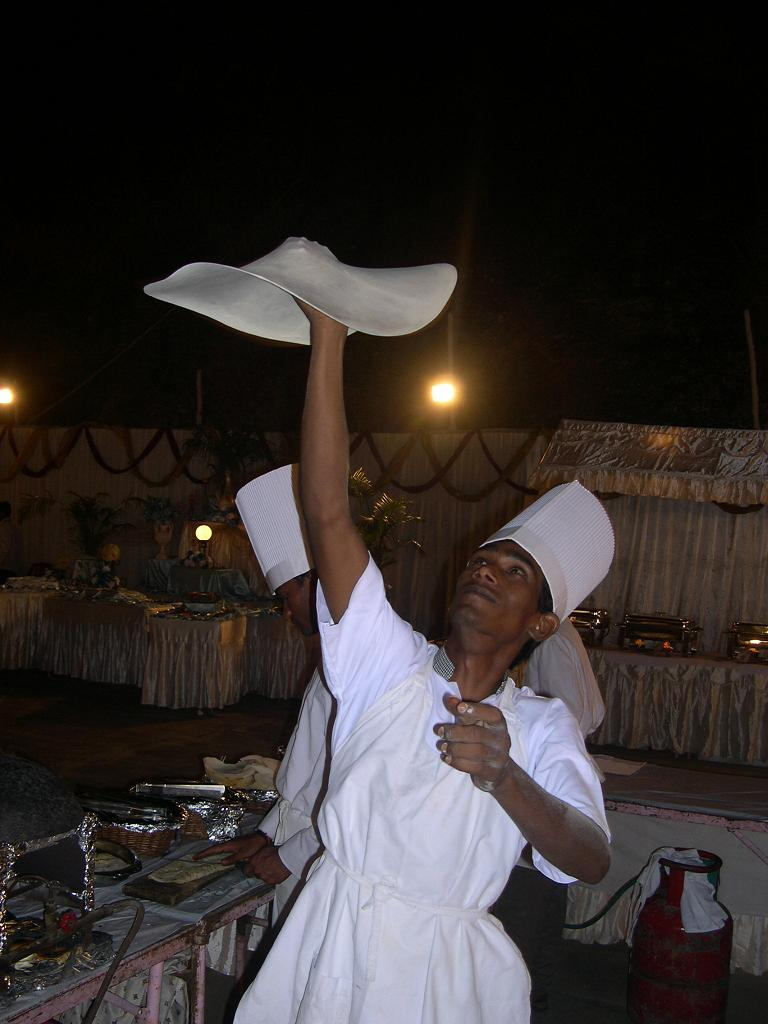
A chef preparing manda roti

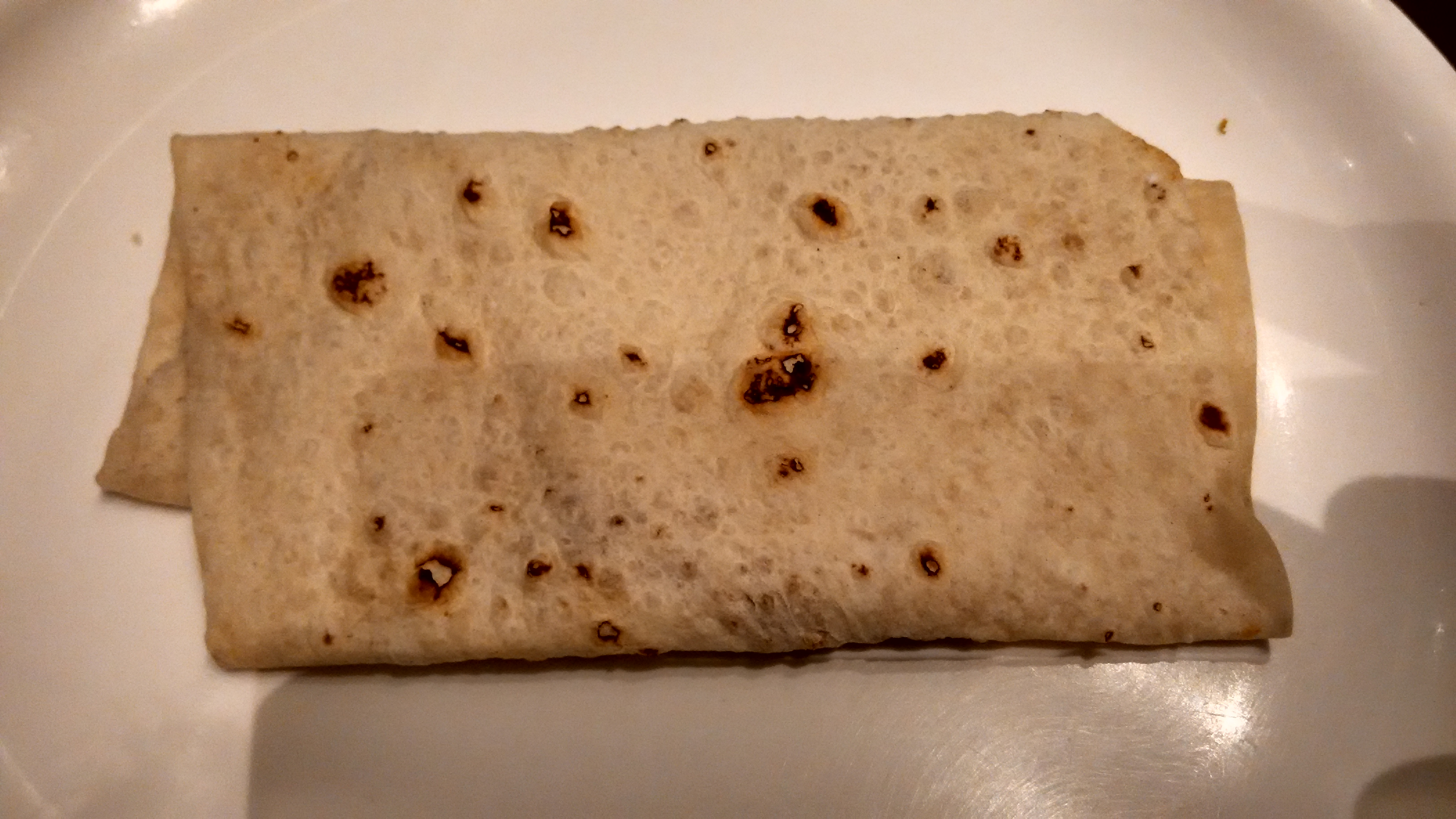
Manda roti
