= Hugh Tinker =

British historian

Hugh Russell Tinker (20 July 1921 – 15 April 2000) was a British historian. He taught politics at Lancaster University for many years.

== Biography ==
Tinker was born on 20 July 1921 in Westcliff-on-Sea, Essex, to Clement Hugh Tinker and Gertrude Marian Russell. His mother was a schoolteacher and his father a broker of shipping insurance. Tinker was educated at Holly School, Sheringham, and Taunton School. Although he was educated to work as a librarian, he enlisted in the Royal Armoured Corps on 3 October 1939 to serve in World War II. After the end of the war he read history at Sidney Sussex College, Cambridge, and was tutored by David Thomson. From 1948 Tinker lectured at the SOAS University of London, teaching Southeast Asia's modern history. He also received a degree from London University in public administration. Tinker married Elisabeth McKenzie Willis on 23 August 1947.

== Academic and research career ==
He published his first book in 1954 on the government of India, Pakistan, and Burma. The Oxford Dictionary of National Biography describes him as becoming "Britain's foremost historian of modern Burma." Tinker spent a year at the University of Rangoon as a visiting professor from 1954 to 1955, and two years later published The Union of Burma: a Study of the First Years of Independence. Tinker continued to teach at SOAS. He unsuccessfully ran for a seat in Parliament three times and continued to publish works, notably on the history of Burma. Aung San Suu Kyi, a Burmese politician, was at one point Tinker's student.

He directed the Institute of Race Relations from 1970 to 1972. That year he moved to the Institute of Commonwealth Studies and researched topics including the Indian diaspora. From 1977 to 1982 Tinker taught politics at Lancaster University and was made professor emeritus after retiring. Tinker published A Message from the Falklands in 1982 after his son died in the Falklands War.
