= Atta (flour) =

Type of wheat flour

Atta flour
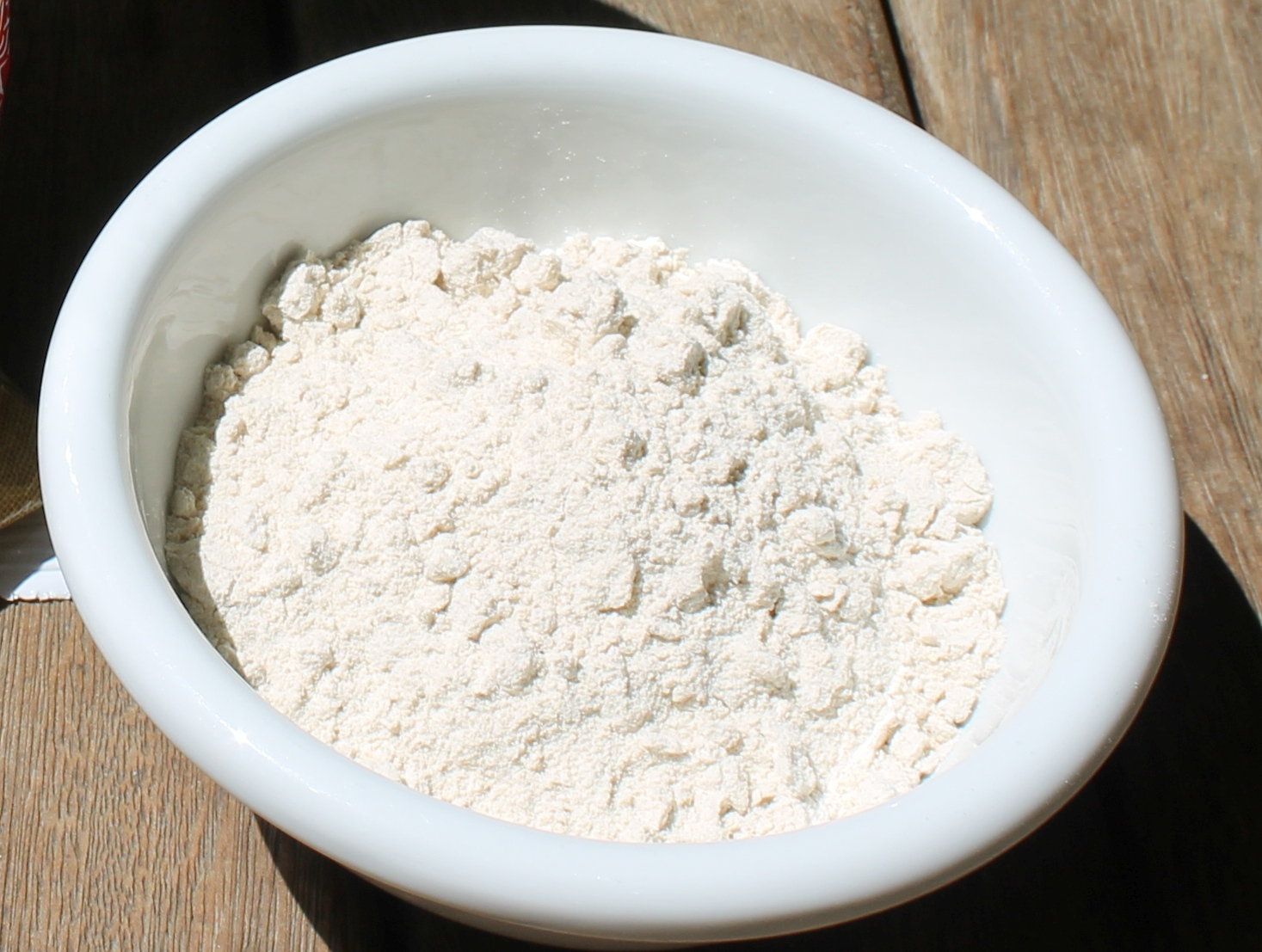
- Atta in a bowl
- Place of origin: Indian subcontinent
- Region or state: South Asia

Atta (Hindi: आटा, IPA: [aːʈaː]) is a type of wheat flour, originally from the Indian subcontinent, used to make flatbreads.

It is the most widespread flour in the Indian subcontinent.

== Properties ==
Whole common wheat (Triticum aestivum) is generally used to make atta; it has a high gluten content, which provides elasticity, so the dough made out of atta flour is strong and can be rolled into thin sheets.

The word "whole" is used to describe atta as it includes every component of the grain, meaning the bran, germ and the endosperm.

Atta was traditionally ground in the home on a stone chakki mill. This is useful when using a tandoor, where the flatbread is stuck to the inside of the oven, and also makes chapatis softer as the dough absorbs more water. Atta is also produced in industrial flour mills.

== Gallery ==
Rolling of atta dough

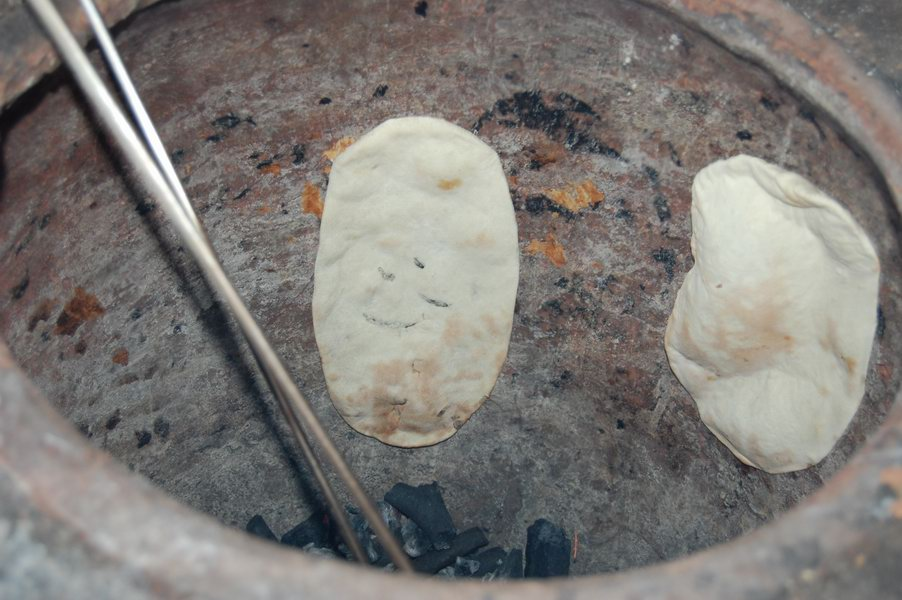
Roti cooking in a tandoor

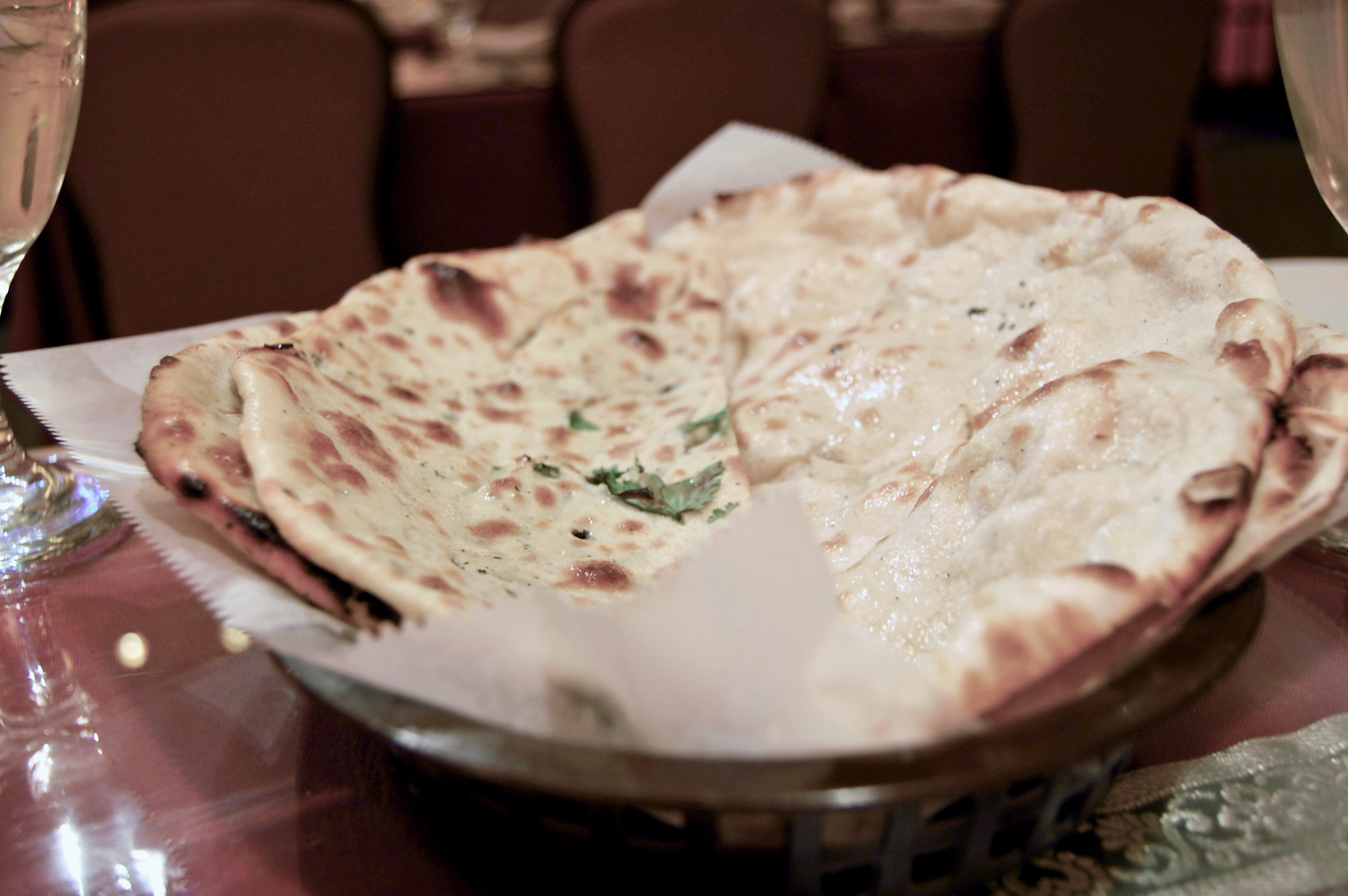
Paratha

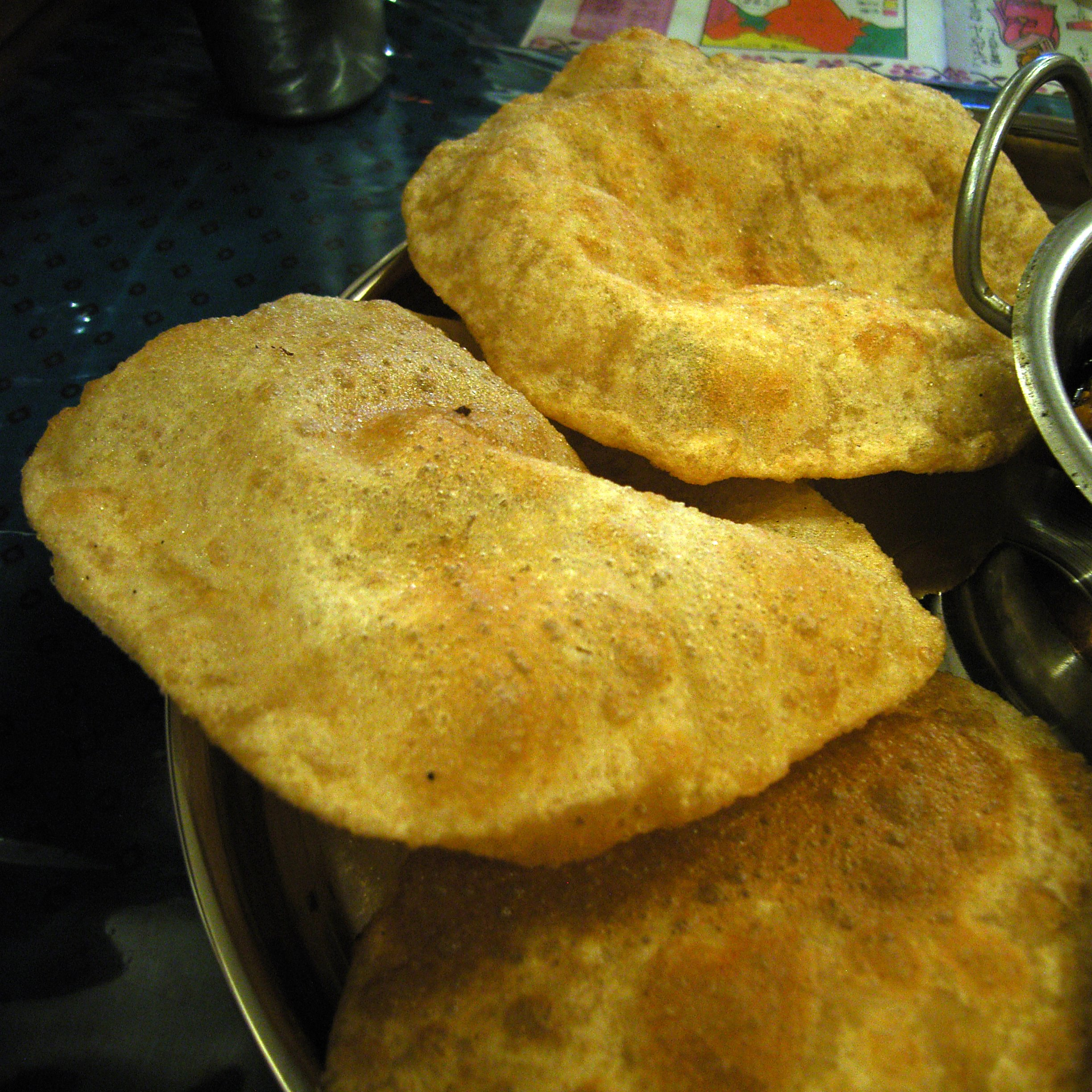
Puri

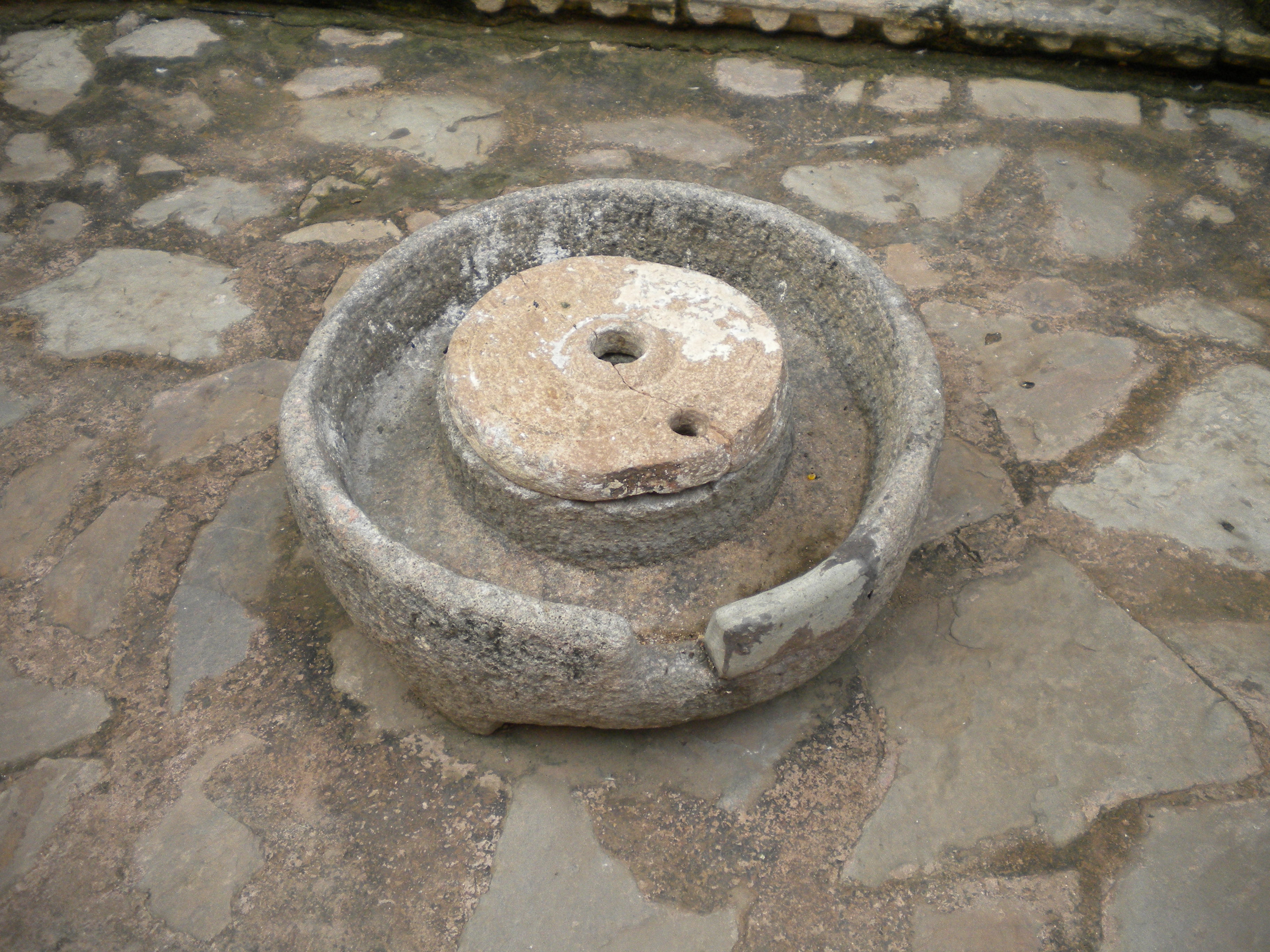
A chakki mill used to make atta

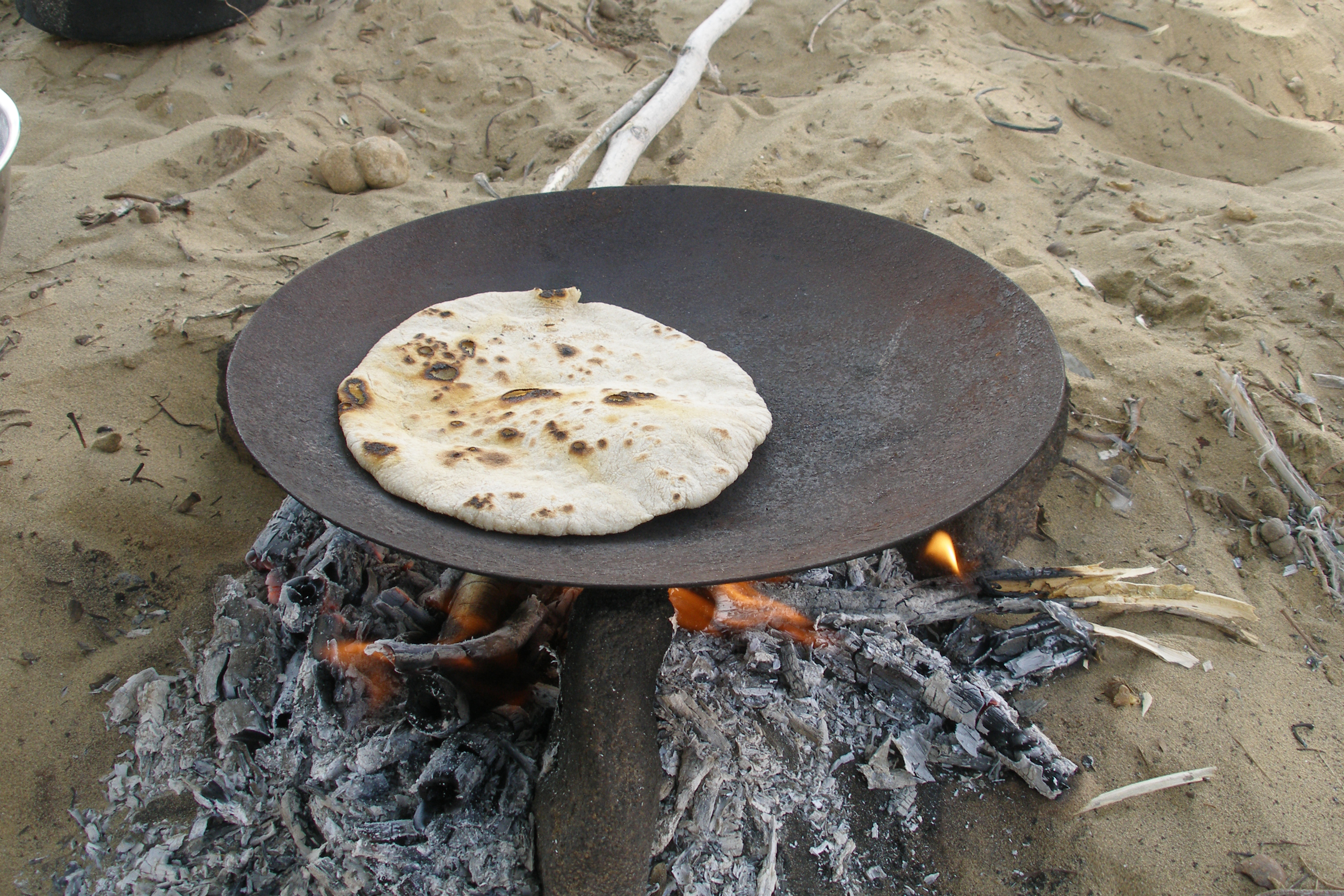
Chapati

== See also ==
- Maida flour
- Roti
