= List of ship launches in 1890 =

The list of ship launches in 1890 is a chronological list of ships launched in 1890.

Date	Ship	Class	Builder	Location	Country	Notes
1 January	Unnamed	Steamship	Palmer's Shipbuilding and Iron Company	Newcastle upon Tyne	United Kingdom	For private owner.
6 January	Rappahannock	Full-rigged ship		Bath, Maine	United States	For private owner.
8 January	Rosneath	Steamship	Murdoch & Murray	Port Glasgow	United Kingdom	For P. H. Dixon & Harrison.
8 January	Wistow Hall	Steamship	Caird & Co.	Greenock	United Kingdom	For Sun Shipping Company.
9 January	Gleaner	Sharpshooter-class torpedo gunboat		Sheerness Dockyard	United Kingdom	For Royal Navy.
9 January	Gossamer	Sharpshooter-class torpedo gunboat		Sheerness Dockyard	United Kingdom	For Royal Navy.
9 January	Rasmara	Paddle steamer	A. & J. Inglis	Pointhouse	United Kingdom	For British India Steam Navigation Company.
13 January	Liberty	Steamship	Earle's Shipbuilding	Hull	United Kingdom	For Lancashire and Yorkshire Railway.
20 January	Blenheim	Steamship	Edward Withy & Co.	Hartlepool	United Kingdom	For Steel, Young & Co.
20 January	Mayflower	Brig		Pembroke Dockyard	United Kingdom	For Royal Navy.
21 January	Eugenie	Steamship	Richardson, Duck & Co.	Stockton-on-Tees	United Kingdom	For Burdick & Cook.
21 January	Illovo	Steamship	Hall, Russell & Co.	Aberdeen	United Kingdom	For J. T. Rennie & Sons.
21 January	Umbilo	Steamship	William Gray & Company	Hartlepool	United Kingdom	For Natal Direct Line.
22 January	Bremerhaven	Steamship	Russell & Co.	Greenock	United Kingdom	For Stursberg & Co.
22 January	Mary Beyts	Steamship	William Doxford & Sons	Sunderland	United Kingdom	For Bombay London Steamship Co. Ltd.
22 January	Matsushima	Matsushima-class cruiser	Forges et Chantiers de la Méditerranée	La Seyne	France	For Imperial Japanese Navy.
22 January	Naparima	Steamship	Edwards Shipbuilding Company (Limited)	Howdon-on-Tyne	United Kingdom	For Caw, Prentice, Clapperton & Co.
22 January	Tyrian	Steamship	Day, Summers & Co.	Southampton	United Kingdom	For Union Steamship Company.
23 January	Alexander Elder	Cargo ship	Harland & Wolff	Belfast	United Kingdom	For Elder Dempster.
23 January	Bussard	Bussard-class cruiser	Kaiserliche Werft	Danzig	Germany	For Kaiserliche Marine.
23 January	Cushing	Torpedo boat	Herreshof Manufacturing Company	Bristol, Rhode Island	United States	For United States Navy.
23 January	Fascadale	Full-rigged ship	Alexander Stephen & Sons	Linthouse	United Kingdom	For J. & A. Roxburgh.
23 January	Jane Radcliffe	Steamship	Palmer's Shipbuilding and Iron Company	Jarrow	United Kingdom	For Evan Thomas, Radcliff & Co.
23 January	Princess Victoria	Paddle steamer	William Denny & Brothers	Dumbarton	United Kingdom	For Portpatrick and Wigtownshire Railways (Joint Committee).
23 January	Unnamed	Steamship	John Fullerton & Co.	Merksworth	United Kingdom	For Newry & Kilkeel Steamship Company (Limited).
24 January	Francisco Vidello	Steamship	David J. Dunlope & Co.	Port Glasgow	United Kingdom	For Vincente, Martinez & Co.
29 January	Unnamed	Torpedo boat		Bristol, Rhode Island	United States	For United States Navy.
30 January	Unnamed	Corvette		Constantinople	Ottoman Empire	For Ottoman Navy.
30 January	Unnamed	Gunboat		Constantinople	Ottoman Empire	For Ottoman Navy.
30 January	Unnamed	Torpedo boat		Constantinople	Ottoman Empire	For Ottoman Navy.
30 January	Unnamed	Lightship		Constantinople	Ottoman Empire	For Ottoman Government.
30 January	Unnamed	Type unknown		Constantinople	Ottoman Empire	For Ottoman Navy.
5 February	Persian	Pearl-class cruiser	Armstron Mitchell	Elswick	United Kingdom	For Royal Navy.
5 February	Strathgryfe	Barque	Russell & Co.	Port Glasgow	United Kingdom	For J. & W. Stewart.
6 February	Gladestry	Steamship	R. Irvine & Co.	West Hartlepool	United Kingdom	For Sivewright, Bacon & Co.
6 February	Lake Fisher	Schooner	MacIlwaine & MacColl	Belfast	United Kingdom	For Fisher & Sons.
6 February	Palamcotta	Steamship	A. & J. Inglis	Pointhouse	United Kingdom	For British India Steam Navigation Company.
6 February	104	Whaleback barge	American Steel Barge Company	Duluth, Minnesota	United States	For American Steel Barge Company.
6 February	Unnamed	Steam fishing boat	Mare Bros.	Leith	United Kingdom	For T. R. Redhead.
8 February	Centurion	Steamship	John Blumer & Co.	Sunderland	United Kingdom	For John Blumer & Co.
8 February	St. Pancras	Steamship	Harland & Wolff	Belfast	United Kingdom	For Rankin, Gilman & Co.
9 February	Normannia	Ocean liner	Fairfield Shipbuilding and Engineering Company	Govan	United Kingdom	For Hamburg-Amerikanische Packetfahrt-Actien-Gesellschaft.
10 February	Almirante Lynch	Torpedo gunboat	Laird Bros.	Birkenhead	United Kingdom	For Chilean Navy.
12 February	Nanchang	Coaster	London and Glasgow Engineerng and Iron Shipbuilding Company (Limited)	Glasgow	United Kingdom	For John Swire and Sons.
17 February	Netherby Hall	Steamship	Caird & Co.	Greenock	United Kingdom	For R. Alexander & Son.
17 February	Pilcomayo	Steamship	Murdoch & Murray	Port Glasgow	United Kingdom	For private owner.
18 February	Storm King	Steamship	Raylton Dixon & Co.	Stockton-on-Tees	United Kingdom	For W. Ross & Co.
18 February	Trevalgan	Steamer	John Readhead & Sons	South Shields	United Kingdom	This is the 19th vessel built by the firm for Messrs Hains and Sons of St Ives.
18 February	Windsor	Steamship	W. Gray & Co. (Limited)	West Hartlepool	United Kingdom	For Watts, Ward & Co.
19 February	Circassia	Steamship	Gourlay Bros	Dundee	United Kingdom	For Paquet et Compagnie.
19 February	Otra	Steamship	G. & H. Morton & Co.	Leith	United Kingdom	For Charles Salveson & Co.
19 February	Shaftesbury	Steamship	Craig, Taylor & Co.	Stockton-on-Tees	United Kingdom	For private owner.
20 February	Avala	Steamship	Ropner & Sons	Stockton-on-Tees	United Kingdom	For private owner.
20 February	Benares	Steamship	Barclay, Curle & Co.	Whiteinch	United Kingdom	For "Hamburg-Calcutta Line".
20 February	Mayhill	Barque	Alexander Stephen & Sons	Linthouse	United Kingdom	For W. J. Myles, Son & Co.
20 February	Minnie Hinde	Steamship	MacIlwaine & MacColl	Belfast	United Kingdom	For William Hinde.
20 February	Oakland	Cargo liner	Murray Brothers	Dumbarton	United Kingdom	For William T. Yeager.
20 February	Pocklington	Steamship	W. Gray & Co. (Limited)	West Hartlepool	United Kingdom	For private owner.
20 February	Psara (Ψαρά)	Hydra-class ironclad	Forges et Chantiers de la Méditerranée	Le Havre	France	For Royal Hellenic Navy.
21 February	Bankburn	Barque	Grangemouth Dockyard Company	Alloa	United Kingdom	For Just & Co.
21 February	Cyrnos	Steamship	David J. Dunlop & Co.	Port Glasgow	United Kingdom	For Compagnie Fraissinet.
22 February	Bannes	Steamship	Kellybank Shipbuilding	Alloa	United Kingdom	For Harloff & Boe.
22 February	California	Barque	Harland & Wolff	Belfast	United Kingdom	For North Western Shipping, or Ismay, Imrie & Co.
22 February	Chichester	Steamship	Workman, Clark & Co.	Belfast	United Kingdom	For William R. Rea.
22 February	Coomassie	Steamship	Naval Construction & Armaments Company	Barrow-in-Furness	United Kingdom	For Elder, Dempster & Co.
22 February	Cornelian	Steamship	Scott & Co.	Bowling	United Kingdom	For William Robertson.
22 February	Heung Shan	Steamship	Ramage & Ferguson	Leith	United Kingdom	For Hong Kong, Canton & Macao Steamship Company.
22 February	Kasara	Steamship	Ailsa Shipbuilding Company	Troon	United Kingdom	For British India Steam Navigation Company.
22 February	Strathesk	Steamship	Russell & Co.	Greenock	United Kingdom	For Burrell & Sons.
24 February	Tasso	Steamship	Earle's Shipbuilding Company	Hull	United Kingdom	For Wilson Line.
26 February	Clacton Belle	Paddle steamer	William Denny & Bros.	Dumbarton	United Kingdom	For London, Woolwich and Clacton-on-Sea Steamboat Company.
26 February	Penrhyn Castle	Steamship	Charles Hill & Sons	Bristol	United Kingdom	For private owner.
February	Alfred Dumois	Steamship	Blackwood & Gordon	Port Glasgow	United Kingdom	For Jacob Christensen.
February	Almendra	Steam launch	Davie & M'Kendrick	Govan	United Kingdom	For private owner.
February	Bellagio	Steamship	D. & W. Henderson & Co.	Partick	United Kingdom	For Bell Bros. & M'Lelland.
February	Pleneta	Coaster	A. M'Millan & Son	Dumbarton	United Kingdom	For M. Paul & Co.
February	Simon Dumois	Steamship	Grangemouth Shipbuilding Company	Grangemouth	United Kingdom	For private owner.
February	Tong Shan	Spar-deck ship	Harvey and Co	Hayle	United Kingdom	For private owner.
February	Yumuri	Steamship	Raylton Dixon & Co.	Middlesbrough	United Kingdom	For P. G. Pettersen.
February	Yunnan	Steamship	Scott & Co.	Greenock	United Kingdom	For China Navigation Company.
February	Unnamed	Steam fishing boat	Marr Bros.	Leith	United Kingdom	For T. R. Readhead.
4 March	Simla	Barque	Russell & Co.	Port Glasgow	United Kingdom	For G. M. Steeves.
5 March	Simla	Steamship	Raylton Dixon & Co.	Middlesbrougg	United Kingdom	For Elder, Dempster & Co.
5 March	Veinticinco de Mayo	Cruiser	Armstrong, Mitchell & Co.	Newcastle upon Tyne	United Kingdom	For Argentine Navy.
6 March	Edenballymore	Barque	Russell & Co.	Port Glasgow	United Kingdom	For Thomson, Dickie & Co.
6 March	Enchantress	Steamship	Short Bros.	Sunderland	United Kingdom	For Taylor & Sanderson.
6 March	Fairmead	Steamship	T. Turnbull & Sons	Whitby	United Kingdom	For T. Turnbull & Sons.
6 March	Lizie Cory	Steamship	R. Irvine & Co.	West Hartlepool	United Kingdom	For J. S. Allison & Co.
6 March	Pak Ling	Steamship	Joseph L. Thompson & Sons	Sunderland	United Kingdom	For China Shippers' Mutual Steam Navigation Co., Limited.
6 March	Ptarmigan	Steamship	W. B. Thompson & Co.	Dundee	United Kingdom	For Cork Steamship Company.
8 March	Almirante Condel	Torpedo gunboat	Laird Bros.	Birkenhead	United Kingdom	For Chilean Navy.
8 March	Bussorah	Steamship	W. Gray & Co. (Limited)	West Hartlepool	United Kingdom	For Thomas Appleby.
8 March	Concord	Yorktown-class gunboat	Delaware River Iron Ship Building and Engine Works	Chester, Pennsylvania	United States	For United States Navy.
8 March	Ilimoff	Tanker	Craig, Taylor & Co.	Stockton-on-Tees	United Kingdom	For Alfred Suart.
8 March	Norseman	Steam yacht	Laird Bros.	Birkenhead	United Kingdom	For S. R. Platt.
8 March	Oxus	Steamship	Strand Slipway Company	Sunderland	United Kingdom	For Oxus Steamship Co Ltd.
8 March	Relay	Steamship	Robert Thompson & Sons	Sunderland	United Kingdom	For J. R. France.
8 March	Sea King	Steamship	William Doxford & Sons	Sunderland	United Kingdom	For W. Ross & Co.
8 March	Time	Steamship	Tyne Iron Shipbuilding Co	Willington Quay-on-Tyne	United Kingdom	For Kinghorn Bros.
8 March	Unnamed	Paddle steamer	William Thomas & Sons	Amlwch	United Kingdom	For P. & H. Lewis.
10 March	Beacon Light	Tanker	Sir W. G. Armstrong, Mitchell & Co.	Newcastle upon Tyne	United Kingdom	For R. Stewart & Co.
10 March	Lien Shing	Steamship	London and Glasgow Engineering and Iron Shipbuilding Company, Limited	Govan	United Kingdom	For Indo-China Steam Navigation Company, Limited.
10 March	Managua	Steamship	Grangemouth Dockyard Company	Grangemouth	United Kingdom	For Johann C. Giertsen.
10 March	Unnamed	Steamship	R. & W. Hawthorn, Leslie & Co	Hebburn	United Kingdom	For private owner.
12 March	Brazil	Steamship	J. & G. Thomson	Clydebank	United Kingdom	For Brazilian Steam Navigation Company.
12 March	Rio Paraguay	Steamship	Murdoch & Murray	Port Glasgow	United Kingdom	For Morton & Williamson.
13 March	Melete	full-rigged ship	Charles Connell & Co.	Whiteinch	United Kingdom	For private owner.
19 March	Newark	Protected cruiser	William Cramp & Sons	Philadelphia, Pennsylvania	United States	For United States Navy.
20 March	Almirante Tamandaré	Protected cruiser	Arsenal de Marinha do Rio de Janeiro	Rio de Janeiro	Brazil	For Brazilian Navy.
20 March	Leon	Cargo ship	W. Allsup & Sons Ltd.	Preston	United Kingdom	For Adolph Halvorsen.
20 March	Orla	Steamship	Robert Thompson & Sons	Sunderland	United Kingdom	For W. S. Bailey.
21 March	C.C. Calkins	Steamboat	W. C. Peterson	Seattle, Washington	United Kingdom	For Lake Washington Land & Improvement Co.
21 March	La Touraine	Ocean liner	Chantiers de Penhoët	Saint-Nazaire	France	For Compagnie Générale Transatlantique.
21 March	Trinidad	Steamship	John Blumer & Co.	Sunderland	United Kingdom	For Trinidad Steamship Co. Ltd.
22 March	Minho	Steamship	John Jones & Sons	Liverpool	United Kingdom	For Frederick Leyland & Co.
22 March	Norseman	Steamship	Day, Summers & Co.	Northam	United Kingdom	For Union Steamship Company (Limited).
22 March	Novorossisk	Tug and salvage vessel	Newall and Company	Bristol	United Kingdom	For Vladikavkas Railway Company.
22 March	Prince Ja Ja	Steamship	William Thomas & Son	Amlwch	United Kingdom	For Richards, Mills & Co.
22 March	Vasna	Steamship	Ailsa Shipbuilding Company	Troon	United Kingdom	For British India Steam Navigation Company (Limited).
23 March	Ethelred	Steamship	S. M'Knight & Co	Ayr	United Kingdom	For Macgregor Steamship Company (Limited).
24 March	Calabro	Steamship	Sunderlad Shipbuilding Co. Ltd	Sunderland	United Kingdom	For Puglia Steam Navigation Co.
24 March	Matteo Premuda	Steamship	Blyth Shipbuilding Co. Ltd	Blyth	United Kingdom	For G. M. Premuda di Marittima.
24 March	Siam	Steamship	John Priestman & Co.	Southwick	United Kingdom	For Russel & Spence.
25 March	Empress of China	Ocean liner	Naval Construction & Armaments Co	Barrow in Furness	United Kingdom	For Canadian Pacific Steamships.
25 March	Imaum	Cargo ship	Harland & Wolff	Belfast	United Kingdom	For Edward Bates & Son.
27 March	Ruskin	Steamship	Raylton Dixon & Co.	Middlesbrough	United Kingdom	For Arthur Holland & Co.
28 March	Gulf of Lyons	Steamship	Caird & Co.	Greenock	United Kingdom	For Greenock Steamship Company.
March	Claudine	Steamship	Napier, Shanks & Bell	Yoker	United Kingdom	For Claus Spreckels.
March	Corsican	Steamship	Mackie & Thomson	Govan	United Kingdom	For J. Macfarlane & Co.
March	Elmbank	Barque	Russell & Co.	Port Glasgow	United Kingdom	For Andrew Weir & Co.
March	Highland Chief	Steamship	Alexander Stephen & Sons	Linthouse	United Kingdom	For James Nelson & Son.
March	Hippolyte Dumois	Steamship	T. B. Seath & Co.	Rutherglen	United Kingdom	For Hutson & Corbett.
March	Pérou	Steamship	James Laing	Sunderland	United Kingdom	For Compagnie Maritime du Pacifique.
March	Simla	Barque	Russell & Co.	Port Glasgow	United Kingdom	For G. M. Steeves.
March	Vauban	Steamship	William Hamilton & Co.	Port Glasgow	United Kingdom	For MM. Maurel & H. Prom.
March	Unnamed	Tug	Hawthorns & Co.	Leith	United Kingdom	For Admiralty.
2 April	Hornby	Tug	S. M'Knight & Co.	Ayr	United Kingdom	For Alexandra Towing Company (Limited).
3 April	Brazilian	Steamship	D. & W. Henderson & Co.	Partick	United Kingdom	For Allan Line.
3 April	Ping Suey	Steamship	Barclay, Curle & Co.	Whiteinch	United Kingdom	For China Shippers' Mutual Steam Navigation Company (Limited).
3 April	Retokino	Steamship	William Denny & Bros.	Dumbarton	United Kingdom	For Union Steamship Company of New Zealand (Limited).
5 April	Clyde	Steamship	Robert Napier & Sons	Gova	United Kingdom	For Royal Mail Steam Packet Company.
5 April	Duchess of Fife	Steamship	Hall, Russell & Co.	Aberdeen	United Kingdom	For Aberdeen Lime Company.
5 April	Federal	Collier	William Doxford & Sons	Pallion	United Kingdom	For John McIlwraith.
5 April	Jaboatao	Steamship	A. Hall & Co.	Aberdeen	United Kingdom	For Companhia de Navigacão de Pernambuco.
5 April	The New Yorker	Fireboat			United States	For Government of New York City.
7 April	Brand	Steamship	Robert Duncan & Co.	Port Glasgow	United Kingdom	For Gunnar Knudsen.
7 April	Priam	Steamship	Scott & Co.	Greenock	United Kingdom	For Ocean Steam Ship Company.
8 April	Duckenfield	Collier	Fleming and Ferguson	Paisley	United Kingdom	For J. & A. Brown.
8 April	George Dumois	Steamship	Grangemouth Dockyard Company	Alloa	United Kingdom	For Mr Canhle.
8 April	The Prince	Steamship	John Fullarton & Co.	Paisley	United Kingdom	For J. & J. Hay.
8 April	White Heather	Steam yacht	John Reid & Co.	Port Glasgow	United Kingdom	For R. Cecil Leigh.
8 April	Unnamed	Steamship	Abercorn Shipbuilding Company	Paisley	United Kingdom	For Jacob Christensen.
9 April	Banda	Steamship	Charles Connell & Co.	Scotstoun	United Kingdom	For "Hamburg Calcutta Line".
9 April	Dumbarton Rock	Merchantman	Russell & Co.	Port Glasgow	United Kingdom	For James Cornfoot & Co.
9 April	Gorgon	Steamship	W. H. Potter & Sons	Liverpool	United Kingdom	For Alfred Holt.
10 April	Austria	Steamship	S. P. Austin & Son	Sunderland	United Kingdom	For Walter S. Bailey.
10 April	Rodas	Tug	R. Smith & Co.	Lytham	United Kingdom	For private owner.
15 April	Marchioness of Bredalbane	Paddle steamer	John Reid & Co.	Port-Glasgow	United Kingdom	For Caledonian Steam Packet Company (Limited).
17 April	Apa	Steamship	Robert Duncan & Co.	Port Glasgow	United Kingdom	For Paraguayan Development Company.
17 April	Bute No. 2	Steamship	Scott & Co.	Bowling	United Kingdom	For Hill & Co.
17 April	Gleneden	Steamship	John Priestman & Co.	Sunderland	United Kingdom	For R. Livingston & Co.
17 April	Tandil	Steamship	Raylton Dixon & Co.	Middlesbrough	United Kingdom	For Arthur Holland & Co.
17 April	Torquay	Steamship	R. Thompson & Son	Southwick	United Kingdom	For Whiteway & Ball.
18 April	Adder	Steamship	Fairfield Shipbuilding & Engineering Co.	Govan	United Kingdom	For G. & J. Burns.
18 April	Polynesien	Steamship	Compagnie des Messageries Maritimes	Marseille	France	For Compagnie des Messageries Maritimes.
18 April	Unnamed	Fishing vessel	Albert Dock Shipwright Co. Ltd.	Hull	United Kingdom	For Albert Dock Shipwright Co. Ltd. Unnamed on launch, sold to Hull Steam Fishing & Ice Co. Ltd. and named Rose.
18 April	Unnamed	Fishing boat	Stevenson & Asher	Macduff	United Kingdom	For John M'Rae.
18 April	Unnamed	Fishing boat	Stevenson & Asher	Macduff	United Kingdom	For Murdoch Smith.
19 April	Caen	Caen type, Steamship	Forges et Chantiers de la Méditerranée	Le Havre	France	For Cie. des Chemins de Fer de l'Ouest
19 April	Dolores	Steamship	Raylton Dixon & Co.	Middlesbrough	United Kingdom	For Arthur Holland & Co.
19 April	Girdleness	Steamship	Richardson, Duck & Co.	South Stockton	United Kingdom	For Farrar, Groves & Co.
19 April	Hannah Heye	Barque	W. Pickersgill & Sons	Sunderland	United Kingdom	For Carl Neynaber.
19 April	Iverna	Yacht	Messrs. Fay	Southampton	United Kingdom	For Mr. Jameson.
19 April	Magenta	Marceau-class ironclad		Toulon	United Kingdom	For French Navy.
19 April	Mayfield	Steamship	Bute Shipping, Engineering, & Dry Dock Co.	Cardiff	United Kingdom	For Steamship Mayfield Co. Ltd.
19 April	Michigan	Cargo ship	Harland & Wolff	Belfast	United Kingdom	For Baltimore Lighterage Co.
19 April	Moss Rose	Steamship	Grangemouth Dockyard Company	Grangemouth	United Kingdom	For Richard Hughes.
19 April	Talune	Steamship	Ramage & Ferguson	Leith	United Kingdom	For Tasmania Steam Navigation Company.
19 April	Tellus	Steamship	Osbourne, Graham & Co.	North Hylton	United Kingdom	For Wilhelm Wilhelmsen.
21 April	Prodano	Steamship	Blyth Shipbuilding Co. Ltd	Blyth	United Kingdom	For Pinkney & Sons Steamship Co. Ltd.
21 April	Therese Heymann	Steamship	Ropner & Son	Stockton-on-Tees	United Kingdom	For M'Nabb, Rougier & Co.
22 April	Calcutta City	Steamship	W. Gray & Co (Limited)	West Hartlepool	United Kingdom	For Christopher Furness.
22 April		Torpedo gunboat	Laird Bros.	Birkenhead	United Kingdom	For Argentine Navy.
22 April	Wedonga	Steamship	A. & J. Inglis	Partick	United Kingdom	For Australasian United Steamship Company (Limited).
23 April	Andromeda	Merchantman	Robert Duncan & Co.	Port Glasgow	United Kingdom	For George F. Smith.
23 April	Hawksdale	Full-rigged ship	Charles Joseph Bigger	Londonderry	United Kingdom	For Hawksdale Ship Co. Ltd.
23 April	Skomvær	Barque	J. C. & G. Knudsen	Porsgrund	Norway	For Jørgen Christian Knudsen.
23 April	Wharfe	Steamship	William Dobson & Co.	Walker	United Kingdom	For Goole Steam Shipping Company.
23 April	Zambezi	Barquentine	Grangemouth Dockyard Company	Grangemouth	United Kingdom	For Fabre et Fils.
23 April	Unnamed	Hopper dredger	A. Hall & Co.	Footdee	United Kingdom	For Helmsdale Harbour Trustees.
24 April	Askpodel	Steamship	Alexander Stephen & Sons	Linthouse	United Kingdom	For J. Bruce Murray.
24 April	Lord Bangor	Steamship	Russell & Co.	Greenock	United Kingdom	For Lord Line.
25 April	Tortugu	Schooner	Blackwood & Gordon	Port Glasgow	United Kingdom	For James & Alexander Allen.
25 April	Unnamed	Fishing boat	George Duncan	Macduff	United Kingdom	For Murdoch M'Kenzie.
26 April	Minnedosa	Schooner	Montreal Transportation Company	Kingston	Canada	For Montreal Transportation Company.
30 April	Nunho	Steamship	John Jones & Co.	Liverpool	United Kingdom	For F. Leyland & Sons.
30 April	Unnamed	Steamship	Wood, Skinner & Co.	Newcastle upon Tyne	United Kingdom	For Soudenfjields Norske Dampskibsskelskab.
April	Asphodel	Steamship	Alexander Stephen & Sons	Linthouse	United Kingdom	For J. Bruce Murray.
April	Baracoa	Steamship	S. & H. Morton	Leith	United Kingdom	For Harloff & Boe.
April	Chicharra	Schooner	Blackwood & Gordon	Port Glasgow	United Kingdom	For James & Alexander Allen.
April	Duchess of Hamilton	Paddle steamer	William Denny & Bros.	Dumbarton	United Kingdom	For Caledonia Steam Packet Company (Limited).
April	Garnet Hill	Merchantman	Russell & Co.	Port Glasgow	United Kingdom	For Hill Line.
April	Heung Stram	Steamship	Ramage & Ferguson	Leith	United Kingdom	For Hong Kong and Macao Steamship Company.
April	Portugo	Schooner	Blackwood & Gordon	Port Glasgow	United Kingdom	For James & Alexander Allen.
April	Rotokine	Steamship	William Denny & Bros.	Dumbarton	United Kingdom	For United Steamship Company of New Zealand (Limited).
April	Sama	Steamship	Abercorn Shipbuilding Company	Paisley	United Kingdom	For Jacob Christensen.
April	Upa	Steamship	Robert Duncan & Co.	Port Glasgow	United Kingdom	For Paraguayan Development Company.
April	Wodonga	Steamship	A. & J. Inglis	Partick	United Kingdom	For Australia United Steam Navigation Company (Limited).
3 May	City of Dundee	Steamship	Workman, Clarke & Co.	Belfast	United Kingdom	For George Smith & Sons.
3 May	Clara	Steamship	John Blumer & Co.	Sunderland	United Kingdom	For Robinson Bros.
3 May	Cookham	Steamship	T. R. Oswald & Co., Limited	Sunderland	United Kingdom	For Lambert Bros.
3 May	Norna	Steamship	Edward Withy & Co.	Hartlepool	United Kingdom	For Herskind & Woods.
3 May	Sestao	Steamship	W. Gray & Co. (Limited)	West Hartlepool	United Kingdom	For Ramon de la Sota.
5 May	Hokkai Maru	Steamship	Craig, Taylor & Co.	Stockton-on-Tees	United Kingdom	For Japan Mail Steamshhip Co.
5 May	Hygeia	Paddle steamer	Napier, Shanks & Bell	Yoker	United Kingdom	For Huddart, Parker & Co.
5 May	Nan	Yacht	Messrs. Fife	Fairlie	United Kingdom	For T. C. Burrowes.
5 May		Cruiser	Armstrong, Mitchell & Co.	Newcastle upon Tyne	United Kingdom	For Argentine Navy.
5 May	Gannet	Steamship	David MacGill & Co.	Irvine	United Kingdom	For Glasgow & Greenock Shipping Company.
5 May	Woodcock	Yacht	Messrs. Fife	Fairlie	United Kingdom	For A. Coats.
5 May	Unnamed	Gunboat	Yarrow & Co.	Poplay	United Kingdom	For Royal Navy.
6 May	Buccaneer	Steamship	John Scott & Co.	Kinghorn	United Kingdom	For private owner.
6 May	Encore	Yacht	W. Fife & Son	Fairlie	United Kingdom	For K. M. Clark.
6 May	Mana	Paddle tug	Fleming & Ferguson	Paisley	United Kingdom	For Timaru Harbour Board.
6 May	Marchioness of Bute	Paddle steamer	John Reid & Co.	Port Glasgow	United Kingdom	For Caledonian Steam Packet Company (Limited).
6 May	Nethergate	Steamship	T. Turnbull & Sons	Whitby	United Kingdom	For Turnbull, Scott & Co.
6 May	Newell A. Eddy	Schooner	Frank W. Wheeler & Co.	West Bay City, Michigan	United States	For Eddy Transportation Co.
7 May	Atacama	Barque	R. & J. Evans & Co.	Liverpool	United Kingdom	For Samuel Wakeham & Son.
7 May		Torpedo gunboat	Laird Bros.	Birkenhead	United Kingdom	For Argentine Navy.
8 May	Alcodene	Steamship	Short Bros	Pallion	United Kingdom	For .
8 May	Strait Fisher	Steamship	MacIlwaine & M'Coll	Belfast	United Kingdom	For James Fisher.
8 May	Varuna	Schooner	Montgomery & Howard	Chelsea, Massachusetts	United States	For Thomas Cooper.
9 May	Asloun	Steamship	Sunderland Shipbuilding Co. Ltd.	Sunderland	United Kingdom	For Adams & Co.
10 May	Vita	Steamship	Ailsa Shipbuilding Company	Troon	United Kingdom	For British India Steam Navigation Company (Limited).
14 May	City of Seattle	Passenger ship	Neafie & Levy	Philadelphia, Pennsylvania	United States	For Puget Sound & Alaska Steamship Company.
15 May	Jessica	Yacht	W. Fife & Sons	Fairlie	United Kingdom	For Mr. Macdonough.
16 May	Inverness	Steamship	Ropner & Son	Stockton-on-Tees	United Kingdom	For G. R. Sanderson & Co.
17 May	Spree	Rivers-class ocean liner	AG Vulcan	Stettin	Germany	For Norddeutscher Lloyd.
17 May	Taff	Steamship	Osbourne, Graham & Co.	North Hylton	United Kingdom	For Cardiff Steamship Co. Ltd.
17 May	Finnieston	Ferry	William Simons & Co.	Renfrew	United Kingdom	For Clyde Trustees.
17 May	Unnamed	Steamship	C. S. Swan, Hunter & Co.	Wallsend	United Kingdom	For Thomas Rodenacker.
17 May	Unnamed	Steamship	Robert Stephenson & Co.	Hebburn	United Kingdom	For F. Stumore & Co.
17 May	Unnamed	Steamship	Wigham, Richardson & Co.	Low Walker	United Kingdom	For Compagnie Anonyme de Navigation Mixte.
19 May	Queensland	Steamship	Joseph L. Thompson & Sons	Sunderland	United Kingdom	For William Kish.
19 May	Darlington	Steamship	Richardson, Duck & Co.	Stockton-on-Tees	United Kingdom	For Commercial Steamship Company (Limited).
20 May	Marlay	Steamship	Workman, Clark & Co.	Belfast	United Kingdom	For R. Tedcastle & Co.
20 May	Pearl	Pearl-class cruiser		Pembroke Dockyard	United Kingdom	For Royal Navy.
20 May	Salado	Steamship	Raylton Dixon & Co.	Middlesbrough	United Kingdom	For Arthur Holland & Co.
20 May	Unnamed	Steamship	John Readhead & Sons	South Shields	United Kingdom	For private owner.
20 May	Unamed	Steamship	Palmer's Shipbuilding & Iron Company, Limited	Jarrow	United Kingdom	For W. & R. Thompson.
20 May	Unnamed	Steamship	Tyne Iron Shipbuilding Co.	Willington Quay	United Kingdom	For Jenneson, Taylor and Company.
21 May	Perth	Steamship	W. B. Thompson & Co.	Dundee	United Kingdom	For Dundee, Perth, and London Shipping Company.
22 May	Dunottar Castle	Passenger ship	Fairfield Shipbuilding and Engineering Company	Fairfield	United Kingdom	For Castle Line.
22 May	Latona	Apollo-class cruiser	Vickers	Barrow-in-Furness	United Kingdom	For Royal Navy.
22 May	Plassey	Steamship	Harland & Wolff	Belfast	United Kingdom	For African Steamship Company.
26 May	Kallatina	Steamship	David J. Dunlop & Co.	Port Glasgow	United Kingdom	For Clarence, Richmond, and Macleay Rivers Steam Navigation Company.
28 May	Angers	Caen type, Steamship	Forges et Chantiers de la Méditerranée	Le Havre	France	For Cie. des Chemins de Fer de l'Ouest
31 May	Dieppois	Steamship	Campbeltown Shipbuilding Company	Campbeltown	United Kingdom	For Robert Delarue.
31 May	Grezashie	Gunboat	Admiralty Dockyard	Saint Petersburg	Russia	For Imperial Russian Navy.
31 May	"Pole Star or Polar Star"	Royal yacht		Saint Petersburg	Russia	For Alexander III.
May	Alcestis	Steamship	Mackie & Thomson	Govan	United Kingdom	For Aitken & Walker.
May	Alert	Steamship	J. Mackenzie & Co.	Leith	United Kingdom	For Union Boating Company.
May	Ardnamurchan	Merchantman	Russell & Co.	Port Glasgow	United Kingdom	For Hugh Hogarth.
May	Baecraig	Merchantman	William Hamilton & Co.	Port Glasgow	United Kingdom	For Hamilton, Harvey & Co.
May	Bosnian	Steamship	Mackie & Thomson	Govan	United Kingdom	For J. M'Farlane & Co.
May	Clutha No. 8	Steamboat	Murray Bros.	Dumbarton	United Kingdom	For Clyde Navigation Trust.
May	Flying Eagle	Tug	W. B. Thompson & Co.	Dundee	United Kingdom	For Clyde Shipping Company.
May	Grimm	Steamship	Charles Connell & Co.	Scotstoun	United Kingdom	For Dampschiffs-Rhederi Hansa.
May	Hirondelle	Steamship	Gourlay Brothers and Company	Dundee	United Kingdom	For General Steam Navigation Company.
May	Miefield	Barque	Russell & Co.	Port Glasgow	United Kingdom	For Alexander Rae & Co.
May	S. R. Kirby	Bulk carrier	Detroit Dry Dock Company	Wyandotte, Michigan	United States	For North Western Transportation Company.
May	Strathallan	Steamship	Russell & Co.	Greenock	United Kingdom	For Birrell & Sons.
May	Talbot	Steamship	S. M'Knight & Co.	Ayr	United Kingdom	For John Bacon (Limited).
May	Tencer	Steamship	Scott & Co.	Greenock	United Kingdom	For Ocean Steamship Company.
May	Taviuni	Steamship	William Denny & Bros.	Dumbarton	United Kingdom	For Union Steamship Company of New Zealand (Limited)
May	Unnamed	Hopper dredger	William Simons & Co.	Renfrew	United Kingdom	For private owner.
May	Four unnamed vessels	Electric launches	T. B. Seath & Co.	Rutherglen	United Kingdom	For Electric Traction Company.
2 June	Kings County	Barque	C. R. Burgess	Kingsport, Nova Scotia	Canada	For William Thompson.
3 June	Bennington	Yorktown-class gunboat	Delaware River Iron Ship Building and Engine Works	Chester, Pennsylvania	United States	For United States Navy.
3 June	Chiyoda	Cruiser	J. & G. Thomson	Clydebank	United Kingdom	For Imperial Japanese Navy.
4 June	Adriatico	Steamship	S. P. Austin & Son	Sunderland	United Kingdom	For Erod C. cav. Gerolimich & Co.
4 June	Commodore	Steam trawler	Messrs. Hawthorns	Leith	United Kingdom	For Thomas Devlin.
4 June	Duke	Steamship	John Fullarton & Co.	Merksworth	United Kingdom	For J. & J. Hay.
4 June	Kangatria	Steamship	William Gray & Co.	West Hartlepool	United Kingdom	For Shaw, Savill & Co.
4 June	Kelton	Merchantman	Robert Duncan & Co.	Port Glasgow	United Kingdom	For Village Line.
4 June	Lincoln	Steam trawler	Robert Thompson & Sons	Sunderland	United Kingdom	For William Liddall.
4 June	Unnamed	Barque	Grangemouth Dockyard Company	Kelliebank	United Kingdom	For James Nourse.
5 June	Frederica	Ferry	J. & G. Thomson	Clydebank	United Kingdom	For London and South Western Railway.
5 June	Isabel	Tug	Vosper & Company	Southampton	United Kingdom	For Watkings & Co.
6 June	Jessie	Steamship	Grangemouth Dockyard Company	Grangemouth	United Kingdom	For Jessie Steamship Company.
7 June	Corea	Steamship	Blyth Shipbuilding Co. Ltd	Blyth	United Kingdom	For Stephens, Mawson & Goss.
7 June	Garthdee	Steamship	Hall, Russell & Co.	Aberdeen	United Kingdom	For Aberdeen and Glasgow Steam Shipping Company.
10 June	Unnamed	Steamship	Blyth Shipbuilding Company	Blyth, Northumberland	United Kingdom	For Stephens, Mawson & Goss.
14 June	Baria	Steamship	James Laind	Sunderland	United Kingdom	For "Hamburg-Calcutta Line".
14 June	Bennington	Yorktown-class gunboat	Delaware River Iron Ship Building and Engine Works	Chester, Pennsylvania	United States	For United States Navy.
15 June	Dai San Seiko Maru	Merchantman		Osaka	Japan	For private owner. Heeled over and sank on launch with the loss of 55 lives.
17 June	Gertrude	Steam yacht	A. & J. Inglis	Pointhouse	United Kingdom	For Mr. Hays.
17 June	Sommedetch Phra Lang	Steamship	Fairfield Shipbuilding and Engineering Company (Limited)	Govan	United Kingdom	For Scottish Oriental Steamship Company.
17 June	Strathavon	Steamship	Russell & Co.	Greenock	United Kingdom	For Burrell & Sons.
18 June	Imperial Prince	Steamship	Short Bros.	Pallion	United Kingdom	For Prince Steam Shipping Co.
18 June	Lizzie	Steamship	Joseph L. Thompson & Sons	Sunderland	United Kingdom	For James Gray.
18 June	May Queen	Steam trawler	Marr Bros.	Leith	United Kingdom	For Mackay & Co.
18 June	Queen Margaret	Steamship	Alexander Stephen & Sons	Linthouse	United Kingdom	For Thomas Dunlop & Sons.
18 June	Voltaire	Steamship	Kellie Bank Shipyard	Alloa	United Kingdom	For Rogers & Bright.
18 June	Unnamed	Steamship	Sudbrook Shipyard	River Severn	United Kingdom	For private owner.
19 June	Glenarm	Steamship	MacIlwaine & McColl	Belfast	United Kingdom	For Antrim Iron Ore Company.
19 June	Jose Romano	Steamship	Grangemouth Dockyard Company	Grangemouth	United Kingdom	For private owner.
19 June	Paheka	Steamship	Robert Ropner & Sons	Stockton-on-Tees	United Kingdom	For C. Furness.
19 June	Scindia	Collier	D. & W. Henderson Ltd.	Glasgow	United Kingdom	For Henderson Bros.
21 June	Presidente Errázuriz	Protected cruiser	Forges et Chantiers de la Méditerranée	La Seyne	France	For Chilean Navy.
21 June	Foyledale	Full-rigged ship	Charles Joseph Bigger	Londonderry	United Kingdom	For Dale Line.
21 June	Unnamed	Passenger ship	R. & W. Hawthorn, Leslie & Co.	Hebburn-on-Tyne	United Kingdom	For Russian Steam Navigation and Trading Company.
23 June	Garnock	Steamship	S. M'Knight & Co.	Ayr	United Kingdom	For Garnock Steamship Company (Limited).
23 June	Glenbreck	Merchantman	Robert Duncan & Co	Port Glasgow	United Kingdom	For Robert. R. Paterson.
26 June	Brenttor	Steamship	John Blumer & Co.	Sunderland	United Kingdom	For J. Holman & Sons, or Thompson Steamship Co.
26 June	Unnamed	Steamship	Wood, Skinner & Co.	Newcastle upon Tyne	United Kingdom	For T. Dannevig.
27 June	Monarch	Steamship	John Dyble	Sarnia	Canada	For Northern Navigation Company Ltd.
28 June	Hesper	Steamship	Bradley Transportation Co.	Cleveland, Ohio	United States	For Ship Owners Dry Dock Company.
30 June	Pallas	Pearl-class cruiser		Portsmouth Dockyard	United Kingdom	For Royal Navy.
June	Arana	Schooner	D. & W. Henderson & Co	Partick	United Kingdom	For James & Alexander Allen.
June	Avispa	Schooner	D. & W. Henderson & Co	Partick	United Kingdom	For James & Alexander Allen.
June	Bandersnatch	Yacht	William Fife, Jr.	Fairlie	United Kingdom	For D. R. Richardson.
June	Danube	Barque	Grangemouth Dockyard Company	Alloa	United Kingdom	For Nourse Line.
June	Holt Hill	Barque	Russell & Co.	Port Glasgow	United Kingdom	For William Price & Co.
June	Hormiga	Schooner	D. & W. Henderson & Co	Partick	United Kingdom	For James & Alexander Allen.
June	Mosquito	Schooner	D. & W. Henderson & Co	Partick	United Kingdom	For James & Alexander Allen.
June	Orion	East Indiaman	Ramage & Ferguson	Leith	United Kingdom	For W. S. Crondace.
June	Peter Iredale	Barque	R. Ritson & Co. Ltd.	Maryport	United Kingdom	For P. Iredale & Porter.
June	Templemore	Merchantman	Russell & Co.	Port Glasgow	United Kingdom	For Thompson, Dickie & Co.
June	Victorina R.	Steamship	Cox & Co.	Falmouth	United Kingdom	For private owner.
1 July	Compañía de Filipinas	Steamship	Lobnitz & Co.	Renfrew	United Kingdom	For Compañía General de Tobacos de Filipinas.
1 July	Phoebe	Pearl-class cruiser		Devonport Dockyard	United Kingdom	For Royal Navy.
2 July	Calcutta City	Steamship	Edward Withy & Co.	Hartlepool	United Kingdom	For C. Furness.
2 July	Quinte	Yacht	Willia Fyffe Jr.	Fairlie	United Kingdom	For A. T. King.
2 July	Unnamed	Fishing boat	Stevenson & Asher	Macduff	United Kingdom	For Angus M'Leod.
3 July	Bristol	Steamship	W. Gray & Co.	Hartlepool	United Kingdom	For Mark Whitwell & Son.
3 July	Madrilano	Steamship	Robert Thompson & Sons	Sunderland	United Kingdom	For M. M. de Arrotegui.
3 July	Oswald	Steamship	T. Turnbull & Sons	Whitby	United Kingdom	For private owner.
3 July	Penwith	Steamship	Messrs Harvey and Company	Hayle	United Kingdom	For Richard B Chellew.
3 July	Sola	Steamship	Raylton Dixon & Co.	Middlesbrough	United Kingdom	For Arthur Holland & Co.
3 July	Unnamed	Steamship	Irvine & Co.	West Hartlepool	United Kingdom	For John Wood & Co.
5 July	Altair	Full-rigged ship	W. H. Potter & Sons	iverpool	United Kingdom	For Boyes & Ruyter.
5 July	Blenheim	Blake-class cruiser	Thames Ironworks & Shipbuilding Company	Leamouth	United Kingdom	For Royal Navy.
5 July	Coimbra	Steamship	A. Hall & Co.	Footdee	United Kingdom	For Oldenburg Portuguese Steamship Company.
5 July	Columbian	Cargo ship	Harland & Wolff	Belfast	United Kingdom	For F. Leyland & Co.
5 July	Culmore	Steamship	John Jones & Co.	Liverpool	United Kingdom	For private owner.
5 July	David Suffern	Schooner		Sudbrook	United Kingdom	For private owner.
5 July	Plassy	Gunboat	Armstrong & Mitchell	Elswick	United Kingdom	For Her Majesty's Indian Marine.
5 July	H. M. Pollock	Steamship	William Doxford & Sons	Pallion	United Kingdom	For Steam Navigation Co. of Ireland, Limited.
5 July	Unnamed	Steamship	James Weatherhead	Eyemouth	United Kingdom	For private owner.
12 July	Lombardia	Regioni-class cruiser	Regio Cantiere di Castellammare di Stabia	Castellammare di Stabia	Italy	For Regia Marina.
15 July	Manchester	Dredger	William Simons & Co.	Renfrew	United Kingdom	For Manchester Ship Canal Company.
15 July	North East	Fishing trawler	Hall, Russell & Co.	Aberdeen	United Kingdom	For Mr Piper and others.
15 July	North West	Fishing trawler	Hall, Russell & Co.	Aberdeen	United Kingdom	For Mr Piper and others.
16 July	Lydia	Steamship	J. & G. Thomson Ltd.	Clydebank	United Kingdom	For London and South Western Railway.
17 July	Alexandria	Steamship	T. B. Seath & Co.	Rutherglen	United Kingdom	For Empreza Esperanca Maritima de Navegacão a Vapeur.
17 July	Haugesund	Steamship	W. Harkess & Son.	Middlesbrough	United Kingdom	For Carl Foss.
17 July	Scharlachberger	Steamship	Sunderland Shipbuilding Co., Ltd.	Sunderland	United Kingdom	For Deutsche Dampfschiffahrts-Gesellschaft Hansa.
17 July	Weybridge	Steamship	Sir Raylton Dixon & Co.	Middlesbrough	United Kingdom	For J. Temperley & Co.
18 July	Halifax City	Steamship	E. Withy & Co.	Hartlepool	United Kingdom	For C. Furness.
18 July	Manchester	Steamship	W. Gray & Co. (Limited)	West Hartlepool	United Kingdom	For Evan, Thomas, Radcliff & Co.
18 July	Mechelin	Steamship	John Fullerton & Co.	Merksworth	United Kingdom	For E. L. Doriga.
19 July	Danby	Steamship	Ropner & Son	Stockton-on-Tees	United Kingdom	For J. Merryweather & Co.
19 July	Higland Prince	Steamship	Short Bros.	Pallion	United Kingdom	For Prince Steam Shipping Co.
19 July	Humming Bird	Yacht	Fay & Co.	Northam	United Kingdom	For Earl Brownlow.
19 July	Lynton	Steamship	John Blumer & Co.	Sunderland	United Kingdom	For J. Holman & Sons.
20 July	Iride	Partenope-class cruiser	Regio Cantiere di Castellammare di Stabia	Castellamare di Stabia	Italy	For Regia Marina.
23 July	City of Perth	Steamship	Workman, Clarke & Co.	Belfast	United Kingdom	For George Smith & Sons.
28 July	Pitcairn	Schooner	Turner & Chapman	Benecia, California	United States	For Seventh-day Adventist Church.
29 July	Burnock	Steamship	S. M'Knight & Co.	Ayr	United Kingdom	For Garnock Steamship Company.
29 July	William Flower	Tug	David J. Dunlop & Co.	Port Glasgow	United Kingdom	For Flower & Everett.
30 July	Hero	Steamship	Sir Raylton Dixon & Co.	Middlesbrough	United Kingdom	For Bristol Steam Navigation Company (Limited).
30 July	Red Cross	Steamship	Joseph L. Thompson & Sons	Sunderland	United Kingdom	For Rowland & Marwood. She collided with the schooner Milo on being launched.
31 July	Imogen	Steam yacht	Fleming & Ferguson	Paisley	United Kingdom	For J. R. Wood.
July	Aranmore	Steamship	W. B. Thompson & Co.	Dundee	United Kingdom	For Clyde Shippig Company.
July	Burmah	Merchantman	Russell & Co.	Port Glasgow	United Kingdom	For Foley, Aikman & Co.
July	Cape York	Barque	Barclay, Curle & Co. Ltd.	Whiteinch	United Kingdom	For Lyle Shipping Company (Limited).
July	Eola	Steamship	A & J. Inglis	Pointhouse	United Kingdom	For British India Steam Navigation Company.
July	Hilda	Yacht	Archibald Dickie	Tarbert	United Kingdom	For William Graham.
July	Lavinia	Steamship	Ailsa Shipbuilding Company	Troon	United Kingdom	For Mackenzie & Co.
July	Minerva	Yacht	Fyfe & Sons	Fairlie	United Kingdom	For William Goucharoff.
July	Nellie	Yacht	Fyfe & Sons	Fairlie	United Kingdom	For E. Kol.
July	Oeiers	Yacht	Fyfe & Sons	Fairlie	United Kingdom	For Paul Rath.
July	Prinses Sofie	Steamship	Caird & Co.	Greenock	United Kingdom	For Stoomvaart Maatschappij Nederland.
July	Swanhilda	Merchantman	A. M'Millan & Son	Dumbarton	United Kingdom	For J. W. Carmichael & Co.
July	Thea Nano	Steamship	Fairfield Shipbuilding and Engineering Company	Fairfield	United Kingdom	For Scottish Oriental Steamship Company.
2 August	Congo	Steamship	Richardson, Duck & Co.	South Stockton	United Kingdom	For Thomas Wilson, Sons, & Co.
2 August	Dundee	Steamship	John Scott & Co.	Kinghorn	United Kingdom	For James Rankin & Sons.
2 August	Melampus	Apollo-class cruiser	Naval Construction and Armaments Company	Barrow-in-Furness	United Kingdom	For Royal Navy.
2 August	Rubio	Steamship	R. Irvine & Co.	West Hrtlepool	United Kingdom	For Orders & Handford.
2 August	Tekoa	Steamship	Sir William Gray and Company Limited	West Hartlepool	United Kingdom	For New Zealand Steamship Company.
2 August	Tynehead	Steamship	Ropner & Son	Stockton-on-Tees	United Kingdom	For Christopher Furness.
2 August	Wells City	Steamship	Charles Hill & Sons	Bristol	United Kingdom	For Bristol City Line.
2 August	Unnamed	Tug	Tyneside Engine Works Company (Limited)	Cardiff	United Kingdom	For Strong & Co.
2 August	Unnamed	Dredger	Fleming & Ferguson	Paisley	United Kingdom	For Manchester Ship Canal Company. Launched at Warburton, Lancashire.
2 August	Unnamed	Steamship	John Jones & Sons	Liverpool	United Kingdom	For private owner.
4 August	Doune Castle	Steamship	Barclay, Curle & Co.	Whiteinch	United Kingdom	For Castle Line Mail Packet Company.
4 August	Innamincka	Steamship	Napier, Shanks & Bell	Glasgow	United Kingdom	For Adelaide Steamship Company.
4 August	Lanark	Steamship	Russell & Co.	Greenock	United Kingdom	For G. M. Steeves.
4 August	Myrmidon	Steamship	Scott & Co.	Greenock	United Kingdom	For Oates Steamship Company.
4 August	Vadala	Steamship	William Denny and Brothers	Dumbarton	United Kingdom	For British India Steam Navigation Company.
5 August	Snaigow	Barque	Russell & Co.	Kingston	United Kingdom	For David Bruce & Co.
13 August	Morena	Steamship	S. & H. Morton	Leith	United Kingdom	For North British Railway.
13 August	Nevada	Steamship	Ramage & Ferguson	Leith	United Kingdom	For North British Railway.
13 August	Stubbenhuk	Cargo ship	Charles Connell and Company	Scotstoun	United Kingdom	For Dampfschiffs-Rhederei Hansa.
14 August	Andromache	Apollo-class cruiser	Chatham Dockyard	Chatham, Kent	United Kingdom	For Royal Navy.
14 August	Benlomond	Steamship	Alexander Stephen & Sons	Linthouse	United Kingdom	For Ben Line.
14 August	Ethelwood	Steamship	Workman, Clarke & Co., (Limited)	Belfast	United Kingdom	For Macgregor Steamship Company (Limited).
15 August	Olivine	Steamship	Scott & Co.	Bowling	United Kingdom	For William Robertson.
16 August	Ely	Steamship	Osbourne, Graham & Co	North Hylton	United Kingdom	For Cardiff Steamship Co.
16 August	Georgian	Cargo ship	Harland & Wolff	Belfast	United Kingdom	For F. Leyland & Co.
16 August	Orion	Steam lighter	J. & J. Hay	Forth and Clyde Canal	United Kingdom	For private owner.
16 August	Parkmore	Steamship	Charles Joseph Bigger	Londonderry	United Kingdom	For S.S. Parkmore Ltd.
16 August	Prins Willem I	Steamship	Richardson, Duck & Co.	Stockton-on-Tees	United Kingdom	For Koninklijke West Indisch Maildienst.
16 August	Ville de Paris	Steamship	James Laing	Sunderland	United Kingdom	For Compagnie Havraise Peninsulaire de Navigation.
17 August	Fazilka	Steamship	William Doxford & Sons	Pallion	United Kingdom	For British India Steam Navigation Company.
18 August	Capenor	Steamship	Edward Withy & Co.	West Hartlepool	United Kingdom	For Steel, Young & Co.
18 August	Orbis	Barque	Grangemouth Dockyard Company	Grangemoutgh	United Kingdom	For Albert, Evers & Classen.
20 August	Culmore	Full-rigged ship	Russell & Co.	Kingston	United Kingdom	For Thompson, Dickie & Co.
20 August	Pass of Brander	Full-rigged ship	Robert Duncan & Co.	Port Glasgow	United Kingdom	For Gibson & Clark.
20 August	Satellite	Steamship	Blackwood & Gordon	Port Glasgow	United Kingdom	For Hill, Gomes & Co.
20 August	Western Reserve	Steamship	Cleveland Shipbuilding Company	Cleveland, Ohio	United States	For Minch Transportation Co.
21 August	Chamois	Steamship	John Priestman & Co.	Sunderland	United Kingdom	For Jackson Bros.
28 August	Annie Walker	Steam trawker	A. Hall & Co	Footdee	United Kingdom	For Thomas Walker.
28 August	Philomel	Pearl-class cruiser	Chatham Dockyard	Chatham, Kent	United Kingdom	For Royal Navy.
29 August	Bellona	Cruiser	R. & W. Hawthorn, Leslie & Co. Ltd.	Newcastle upon Tyne	United Kingdom	For Royal Navy.
29 August	Ellos	Steamship	W. Gray & Co. (Limited)	West Hartlepool	United Kingdom	For Bennets & Co.
29 August	Mississippi	Cargo liner	Harland & Wolff	Belfast	United Kingdom	For Atlantic Transport Line.
30 August	Emin Pasha	barque	Grangemouth Dockyard Company	Grangemouth	United Kingdom	For private owner.
30 August	Empress of India	Ocean liner	Naval Construction & Armaments Co	Barrow in Furness	United Kingdom	For Canadian Pacific Railway.
30 August	Herman Wedel Jarlsberg	Steamship	W. Gray & Co. (Ltd.)	West Hartlepool	United Kingdom	For J. Christensen & Co.
30 August	Infanta Maria Teresa	Infanta Maria Teresa-class cruiser	Sociedad Astilleros del Nervión	Sestao	Spain	For Spanish Navy.
30 August	Manin	Steamship	Raylton Dixon & Co.	Middlesbrough	United Kingdom	For private owner.
30 August	Norman	Steamship	Globe Iron Works Company	Cleveland, Ohio	United States	For Menominee Steamship Co.
30 August	Renown	Steamship	John Duthie, Sons, & Co.	Aberdeen	United Kingdom	For Duthie Brothers & Co.
30 August	Tigris	Steamship	John Blumer & Co.	Sunderland	United Kingdom	For Persian Gulf Steamship Co. Ltd.
30 August	Unnamed	Steam yacht	Ramage & Ferguson	Leith	United Kingdom	For Mr. Wytche.
31 August	Dunbeth	Steamship	Craig, Taylor & Co.	Stockton-on-Tees	United Kingdom	For private owner.
August	Alpha	Hopper barge	Executors of the late T. A. Walker	Sudbrook	United Kingdom	For Manchester Ship Canal Company.
August	Day Spring	Steamship		Honk Kong Harbour	Hong Kong	For Missions to Seaman Reader.
August	Estrella	Steam yacht	Davy & M'Kendrick	Govan	United Kingdom	For H. M'Intyre.
August	Hercules	Tug	Barclay, Curle & Co. Ltd.	Whiteinch	United Kingdom	For Southampton, Isle of Wight, and South of England Royal Mail Steam Packet Company, Limited.
August	Iron King	Steamship	Ailsa Shipbuilding Company	Troon	United Kingdom	For Henry Howie.
August	Ortis	Full-rigged ship	Grangemouth Dockyard Company	Grangemouth	United Kingdom	For Albert, Evers & Classen.
August	Penwith	Steamer	Harvey and Co	Hayle	United Kingdom	For Messrs R B Chellew and Co
1 September	Unnamed	Steamship	Tyne Iron Shipbuilding Company, Limited	Willington Quay	United Kingdom	For private owner.
2 September	France	Merchantman	Henderson & Co.	Partick	United Kingdom	For Anthony Dom Bordes et Fils.
3 September	David T. Leahy	Schooner	C. & R. Poillon	New York	United States	For James D. M. Beebe, Stephen H. Cooper, John L. Godbey, Dennis Reardon, and Jeremiah Reardon.
4 September	Presidente Pinto	Presidente Errázuriz-class cruiser	Forges et Chantiers de la Méditerranée	La Seyne	France	For Chilean Navy.
4 September	Teixeirinha	Steamship	Russell & Co.	Port Glasgow	United Kingdom	For Hill, Gomes & Co.
6 September	Salatiga	Steamship	Sir W. G. Armstrong, Mitchell & Co.	Walker	United Kingdom	For Deutsche Dampschiffs Rhederei.
11 September	Bullara	Steamship	Gourlay Brothers	Dundee	United Kingdom	For Adelaide Steam Shipping Company.
11 September	Fulwell	Steamship	Joseph L. Thompson & Sons	Sunderland	United Kingdom	For Tyzack & Branfoot.
11 September	Iverna	Merchantman	Charles Connell & Co.	Scotstoun	United Kingdom	For A. Mackay & Co.
13 September	Citta de Venezia	Steamship	C. S. Swan, & Hunter	Wallsend	United Kingdom	For Fratelli Lavarello fu Gio Batta.
13 September	Dvenadsat Apostolov	Dvenadsat Apostolov-class battleship	Nikolayev Dockyard	Nikolayev	Russia	For Imperial Russian Navy.
14 September	Shoal Fisher	Schooner	Rodgers & Bell	Carrickfergus	United Kingdom	For James Fisher & Sons.
15 September	Boston	Steamship	Alexander Stephen and Sons	Linthouse	United Kingdom	For Yarmouth Steamship Company.
15 September	Coatham	Steamship	W. Gray & Co. (Limited)	West Hartlepool	United Kingdom	For English & Co.
15 September	Polyphemus	Steamship	Scott & Co.	Greenock	United Kingdom	For Ocean Steam Ship Company.
15 September	Virawa	Steamship	William Denny and Brothers	Dumbarton	United Kingdom	For British India Steam Navigation Company.
16 September	Amra	Steamship	Ailsa Shipbuilding Company	Troon	United Kingdom	For British India Steam Navigation Company.
16 September	Beechdene	Steamship	Short Brothers	Pallion	United Kingdom	For J. T. Lunn & Co.
16 September	Inyoni	Steamship	Hall, Russell & Co.	Aberdeen	United Kingdom	For J. G. Rennie & Sons.
16 September	Robin	Coaster	Mackenzie, MacAlpine & Co. / Robert Thomson	Blackwall	United Kingdom	For Robert Thomson.
16 September	Stella	Ferry	J & G Thomson	Clydebank	United Kingdom	For London and South Western Railway.
17 September	Alacrity	Steamship	Edward Withy & Co.	Hartlepool	United Kingdom	For Wilson & Corner.
17 September	Oxfordness	Steamship	Richardson, Duck & Co.	South Stockton	United Kingdom	For Farrar, Groves & Co.
17 September	Radaas	Steamship	John Readhead & Sons	South Shields	United Kingdom	For Moor Line.
17 September	Sobraon	Cargo ship	Harland & Wolff	Belfast	United Kingdom	For African Steamship Co.
17 September	Vigilancia	Steamship	Delaware River Iron Ship Building and Engine Works	Chester, Pennsylvania	United States	For United States and Brazil Steamship Company.
17 September	Steeling	Steamship	S. & H. Morton & Co.	Leith	United Kingdom	For Ostlandske Lloyd's Kompagnie.
18 September	Marstonmoor	Steamship	John Readhead & Sons	South Shields	United Kingdom	For private owner.
20 September	Ainsdale	Full-rigged ship	Charles Joseph Bigger	Londonderry	United Kingdom	For J. Henry Iredale & Co. Ltd.
20 September	Sardegna	Re Umberto-class ironclad	Arsenale di La Spezia	La Spezia	Italy	For Regia Marina.
22 September	Euridice	Partenope-class cruiser	Regio Cantiere di Castellammare di Stabia	Castellammare di Stabia	Italy	For Regia Marina.
25 September	Ching Ping	Steamship	Blyth Shipbuilding Co. Ltd	Blyth	United Kingdom	For John White.
25 September	Kaiserin Elisabeth	Kaiser Franz Joseph I-class cruiser	Pola Navy Yard	Pola	Austria-Hungary	For Austro-Hungarian Navy.
26 September	Mayumba	Steamship	Sir Raylton Dixon & Co.	Middlesbrough	United Kingdom	For Elder, Dempster & Co.
27 September	Darmstadt	Steamship	Fairfield Shipbuilding and Engineering Company (Limited)	Govan	United Kingdom	For Norddeutsche Lloyd.
27 September	El Sol	Steamship	William Cramp & Sons	Philadelphia, Pennsylvania	United States	For private owner.
27 September	Ipsden	Steamship	W. Gray & Co. (Ltd.)	West Hartlepool	United Kingdom	For John Wood & Co.
29 September	Cambrian King	Merchantman	Russell & Co.	Port Glasgow	United Kingdom	For Thomas Williams & Co.
29 September	Feronia	Steamship	Ropner & Son	Stockton-on-Tees	United Kingdom	For Gladstone & Cornforth.
30 September	North Cape	Steam trawler	John Duthie, Sons & Co.	Aberdeen	United Kingdom	For William Pyper and others.
30 September	Paolo Affonso	Tug	W. Allsup & Sons Ltd.	Preston	United Kingdom	For A. U. de Carvahlo.
30 September	Pentakota	Steamship	A. & J. Inglis	Pointhouse	United Kingdom	For British India Steam Navigation Company (Limited).
30 September	Saint Hubert	Steamship	James Laing	Sunderland	United Kingdom	For British & Foreign Steamship Co. Ltd.
30 September	Unnamed	Fishing boat	Scott & Yule	Fraserburgh	United Kingdom	For Colin M'Leod.
September	Despina	Steamship	Campbeltown Shipbuilding Co.	Campbeltown	United Kingdom	For private owner.
September	Drumalis	Barque	W. Pickersgill & Sons	Southwick	United Kingdom	For P. Iredale & Porter.
September	Garnet	Steamship	W. B. Thompson & Sons	Dundee	United Kingdom	For Gem Line.
September	Mermaid	Hopper dredger	William Simons & Co.	Renfrew	United Kingdom	For Aden Port Trust.
September	Pebble	Steamship	Scott & Co.	Bowling	United Kingdom	For William Robertson.
September	Prins Hendrik	Steamship	Fairfield Shipbuilding and Engineering Company (Limited)	Govan	United Kingdom	For Stoomvaart Maatschappij Nederland.
September	Ripple	Yacht	Fyffe & Son	Fairlie	United Kingdom	For J. S. Lamb.
September	St. George	Steam yacht	Ramage & Ferguson	Leith	United Kingdom	For Ernest J. Wythes.
September	Tapatina	Steamship	Scott & Co.	location	United Kingdom	For Amazon Steam Navigation Company (Limited).
2 October	Comliebank	Barque	Russell & Co.	Port Glasgow	United Kingdom	For Andrew Weit & Co.
4 October	Fultata	Steamship	William Doxford & Sons	Pallion	United Kingdom	For British India Steam Navigation Company.
14 October	Hornet	Steam trawler	Mackie & Thomsen	Govan	United Kingdom	For British Steam Trawler Company (Limited).
14 October	Strathdee	Steam trawler	John Scott & Co.	Kinghorn	United Kingdom	For private owner.
14 October	Wasp	Steam trawler	Mackie & Thomsen	Govan	United Kingdom	For British Steam Trawler Company (Limited).
15 October	Azima	Steamship	Craig, Taylor & Co.	Stockton-on-Tees	United Kingdom	For W. H. Loveridge & Co.
15 October	Ithamo	Steamship	John Priestman & Co.	Sunderland	United Kingdom	For Pinkney Steamship Co. Ltd.
17 October	Gaugut	Ironclad		Saint Petersburg	Russia	For Imperial Russian Navy.
18 October	Anglesea	Steamship	Paul Rodgers & Co.	Carrickfergus	United Kingdom	For Owen Thomas Jones.
18 October	Helen Craig	Steamship	Workman, Clarke & Co.	Belfast	United Kingdom	For Hugh Craig & Co.
18 October	Memphis	Steamship	Harland & Wolff	Belfast	United Kingdom	For Elder & Dempster.
18 October	Susannah Kelly	Steamship	MacIlwaine & MacColl Limited	Belfast	United Kingdom	For John Kelly.
23 October	Eduard Bohlen	Cargo liner	Blohm & Voss	Hamburg	Germany	For Woermann-Linie.
24 October	Patapsco	Steamship	James Laing	Sunderland	United Kingdom	For Neptune Steam Navigation Co. Ltd.
24 October	Unnamed	Steamship	John Readhead and Sons	South Shields	United Kingdom	For Compagnie Générale des Bateaux à Vapeur Havraise du Nord.
24 October	Unnamed	Steamship	Sunderland Shipbuilding Company	Sunderland	United Kingdom	For Société Générale des Transports Maritimes.
25 October	Martin Saenz	Steamship	Charles Connell & Co.	Scotstoun	United Kingdom	For private owner.
25 October	Unnamed	Steamship	Palmer's Shipbuilding and Iron Co., Limited	Jarrow	United Kingdom	For private owner.
25 October	Unnamed	Passenger ship	Robert Stephenson & Co., Limited	Hebburn	United Kingdom	For Thomas Wilson, Sons & Co.
27 October	Dupuy de Lôme	Cruiser	Arsenal de Brest	Brest	France	For French Navy.
27 October	Sirius	Apollo-class cruiser	Armstrong's	Elswick	United Kingdom	For Royal Navy.
27 October	Unnamed	Steamship	Tyne Iron Shipbuilding Co.	Willington Quay	United Kingdom	For Sievwright, Bacon & Company.
28 October	Tuskar	Steamship	W. B. Thompson & Co. Ltd.	Dundee	United Kingdom	For Clyde Shipping Company.
29 October	Macduff	Steamship	W. Gray & Co. (Limited)	West Hartlepool	United Kingdom	For J. Warrack & Co.
29 October	Umona	Cargo line	James Laing	Sunderland	United Kingdom	For Bullard, King & Company, Limited.
29 October	Zanzibar	Steamship	Edward Withy & Co.	Hartlepool	United Kingdom	For F. Woods.
30 October	Terpsichore	Apollo-class cruiser	J. & G. Thomson	Clydebank	United Kingdom	For Royal Navy.
30 October	Lismore Castle	Steamship	Barclay, Curle & Co. (Limited)	Whiteinch	United Kingdom	For Donald Currie & Co.
30 October	Tosari	Steamship	C. S. Swan & Hunter	Wallsend	United Kingdom	For Dampfschiffs Reederi zu Hamburg.
31 October	Guilpue	Barque	Russell & Co.	Port Glasgow	United Kingdom	For Bredersen, Vaughan & Co.
31 October	Pisces	Steam trawler	Mackie & Thomson	Govan	United Kingdom	For Grimsby and North-East Steam Trawling Company.
31 October	Zodiac	Steam trawler	Mackie & Thomson	Govan	United Kingdom	For Grimsby and North-East Steam Trawling Company.
October	David Davies	Hopper dredger	Fleming & Ferguson	Paisley	United Kingdom	For Barry Dock and Railway Company.
October	Guaranay	Steamship	Scott & Co.	Greenock	United Kingdom	For Amazon Steam Navigation Company.
October	Hatasoo	Paddle steamer	M'Arthur & Co.	Paisley	United Kingdom	For Thomas Cook & Son.
October	Hinemoa	Merchantman	Russell & Co.	Greenock	United Kingdom	For private owner.
October	Irene	Steamship	Napire, Shanks & Bell	Yoker	United Kingdom	For private owner.
October	John Milne	Steam hopper barge	William Simons & Co.	Renfrew	United Kingdom	For Natal Harbour Board.
October	Merlin	Steamship	David M'Gill & Co.	Irvine	United Kingdom	For Glasgow & Greenock Shipping Company.
October	Quilpae	Barque	Russell & Co.	Port Glasgow	United Kingdom	For Brodensen, Vaughan & Co.
October	Taranaca	Steamship	William Kemp	Govan	United Kingdom	For José R. d'Oliveira.
October	William Bell	Steam hopper barge	William Simons & Co.	Renfrew	United Kingdom	For Natal Harbour Board.
1 November	Celtic King	Steamship	Workman, Clarke & Co.	Belfast	United Kingdom	For William Ross & Co.
1 November	Ernesto	Cargo ship	Harland & Wolff	Belfast	United Kingdom	For G. H. Fletcher & Co.
1 November	Swiftsure	Fishing boat	Stevenson & Asher	Macduff	United Kingdom	For Roderick M'Kay.
8 November	Beowulf	Siegfried-class coast defense ship	AG Weser	Bremen	Germany	For Kaiserliche Marine.
11 November	Gera	Steamship	Fairfield Shipbuilding and Engineering Company (Limited)	Govan	United Kingdom	For Norddeutscher Lloyd.
13 November	Galena	Barque	Alexander Stephen & Sons	Dundee	United Kingdom	For Alexander Stephen & Sons.
13 November	Mongolia	Ocean liner	David & Willim Henderson & Co.	Partick	United Kingdom	For James & Alexander Allan.
13 November	The Marquis	Steamship	John Fullarton & Co	Merksworth	United Kingdom	For J. & J. Hay.
13 November	Yung Ping	Steamship	Craig Taylor & Co.	Thornaby-on-Tees	United Kingdom	For Russell & Co.
14 November	Pickhuben	Steamship	Barclay, Curle & Co.	Glasgow	United Kingdom	For Dampfschiffs-Reederi Hansa.
14 November	Unnamed	Hopper dredger	William Simons & Co.	Renfrew	United Kingdom	For Nicaragua Canal Construction Company.
15 November	Hiroshima Maru	Steamship	Robert Thompson & Sons	Southwick	United Kingdom	For Clippon Yusen Kaisha Steamship Company.
15 November	Pyropic	Steamship	Scott & Co.	Greenock	United Kingdom	For William Robertson.
15 November	Tyne	Steamship	Ramage & Ferguson	Leith	United Kingdom	For Royal Mail Steam Packet Company.
16 November	Wirral'	Steamship	Jones & Sons	Liverpool	United Kingdom	For Corporation of Birkenhead.
18 November	Maine	Cruiser	New York Naval Shipyard	Brooklyn, New York	United States	For United States Navy.
21 November	Dimsdale	Merchantman		Londonderry	United Kingdom	For J. Henry Iredale & Co.
22 November	Valentia	Steamship	W. B. Thompson & Co., Limited	Dundee	United Kingdom	For Clyde Shipping Company.
24 November	Edgar	Edgar-class cruiser	Devonport Dockyard	Devonport	United Kingdom	For Royal Navy.
24 November	Fu Ping	Steamship	Blyth Shipbuilding Co. Ltd	Blyth	United Kingdom	For Chinese Engineering & Mining Company.
26 November	America	Steamship	Gourlay Bros. & Co.	Dundee	United Kingdom	For National Steamship Company.
26 November	Chishima	cruiser	Ateliers et Chantiers de la Loire	Saint-Nazaire	France	For Imperial Japanese Navy.
26 November	Glenisle	Steamship	Edward Withy & Co.	Hartlepool	United Kingdom	For Livingstone, Conner & Co.
26 November	Heighington	Steamship	Sir W. Gray & Co., Limited	West Hartlepool	United Kingdom	For Hudson Shipping Company Limited.
26 November	Scottish Bells	Steam trawler	Scott & Co.	Kinghorn	United Kingdom	For Brown & Co.
26 November	Tordenskjold	Barque	Grangemouth Dockyard Company	Alloa	United Kingdom	For Messrs. Lindviz.
27 November	Duke of Portland	Steamship	Grangemouth Dockyard Company	Grangemouth	United Kingdom	For James & Alexander Wyllie.
27 November	Gandia	Steam hopper dredger	William Simons & Co.	Renfrew	United Kingdom	For Alcoy y Gandía Rail & Harbour Co. Ltd.
27 November	Llanthony Abbey	Steamship	Ropner & Son	Stockton-on-Tees	United Kingdom	For Pyman, Watson & Co.
29 November	Azalea	Lighthouse tender	Johnson Foundry & Machine Companh	Manhattan, New York	United States	For United States Lighthouse Board.
29 November	Balmoral Castle	Steam trawler	John Scott & Co.	Kinghorn	United Kingdom	For John Barclay & Co.
29 November	British Crown	Passenger ship	Harland & Wolff	Belfast	United Kingdom	For British Shipowners Ltd.
29 November	Fürst Bismarck	Ocean liner	AG Vulcan	Stettin	Germany	For Hamburg-Amerikanische Packetfahrt-Actien-Gesellschaft.
29 November	Holguie	Steamship	Murdoch & Murray	Port Glasgow	United Kingdom	For Jacob Christensen.
29 November	Naiad	Apollo-class cruiser	Vickers	Barrow-in-Furness	United Kingdom	For Royal Navy.
November	Astree	Merchantman	William Hamilton & Co.	Port Glasgow	United Kingdom	For A. C. Le Quellac.
November	Europe	Steamship	Palmer's Shipbuilding and Iron Company	Jarrow	United Kingdom	For National Steam Shipping Company.
November	Frias	Dredger	Fleming & Ferguson	Paisley	United Kingdom	For T. A. Walker.
November	Gulf of Florida	Steamship	R. & W. Hawthorn, Leslie & Co.	Wallsend	United Kingdom	For Greenock Steamship Company.
November	Invermark	Barque	William Hamilton & Co	Port Glasgow	United Kingdom	For J. Milne.
November	Jolunga	Steamship	William Denny & Brothers	Dumbarton	United Kingdom	For British India Associated Steamers (Limited).
November	Lawang	Steamship	C. S. Swan & Hunter	Wallsend	United Kingdom	For Deutsche Dampfschiffs Rhederei.
November	Petropolis	Paddle steamer	Scott & Co.	Bowling	United Kingdom	For A M'Millan & Son (Limited).
November	Port Stanley	Merchantman	Russell & Co.	Greenock	United Kingdom	For Crawford & Rowat.
November	Re nwick	Steamship	Tyne Iron Shipbuilding Company	Willington Quay	United Kingdom	For Fisher, Renwick & Co.
November	Unnamed	Steamship	Wigham, Richardson & Co.	Walker	United Kingdom	For Afrikanische Dampfschiffs Aktien Gesellschaft.
November	Unnamed	Dredger	Fleming & Ferguson	Manchester Ship Canal	United Kingdom	For T. R. Walker.
1 December	Socotra	Merchantman	Russell & Co.	Greenock	United Kingdom	For P. Dennison & Co.
3 December	Oil Rivers	Steamship	Sir Raylton Dixon & Co.	Middlesbrough	United Kingdom	For Elder, Dempster & Co.
9 December	North Coast	Steam trawler	Hall, Russell & Co.	Aberdeen	United Kingdom	For Mr. Pyper and others.
9 December	North Wind	Steam trawler	Hall, Russell & Co.	Aberdeen	United Kingdom	For Mr. Pyper and others.
11 December	Cariffel	Steamship		Maryport	United Kingdom	For private owner. Ran aground on being launched.
11 December	Invergarry	Barque	A. M'Millan & Son	Dumbarton	United Kingdom	For George Milne & Co.
11 December	Penpol	Steel screw steamer	Messrs Harvey and Co	Hayle	United Kingdom	For R. B. Chellew.
11 December	Vera	Steamship	T. Turnbull & Son	Whitby	United Kingdom	For T. Marwood & Son.
11 December	Unnamed	Dredger	Lobnitz & Co.	Renfrew	United Kingdom	For private owner.
13 December	Empress of Japan	Ocean liner	Naval Construction & Armaments Co	Barrow in Furness	United Kingdom	For Canadian Pacific Steamship Company.
13 December	Pique	Aeolus-class cruiser	Palmer & Co.	Jarrow	United Kingdom	For Royal Navy.
13 December	Princess Irene	Steamship	W. B. Thompson and Company	Dundee	United Kingdom	For M. Langlands & Sons.
13 December	Thetis	Apollo-class cruiser	J. & G. Thomson	Clydebank	United Kingdom	For Royal Navy.
15 December	Aira Force	Steamship	Penarth Shipbuilding and Ship Repairing Company (Limited)	Penarth	United Kingdom	For W. S. Kennaugh & Co.
15 December	Erato	Merchantman	Charles Connell & Co.	Scotstoun	United Kingdom	For private owner.
15 December	Eveleen	Steamship	Workman, Clark, & Co., Limited	Belfast	United Kingdom	For John Milligen.
15 December	Thomas Winsmore	Schooner	C. C. Davidson	Milton, Delaware	United States	For private owner.
16 December	Aberwrach	Tug	Forges et Chantiers de la Gironde	Lormont	France	For: French Navy
16 December	Nordlyset	Barque	Russell & Co.	Greenock	United Kingdom	For Bruüsgaard & Kjösterud.
16 December	Ottawa	Steamship	Alexander Stephen & Sons	Linthouse	United Kingdom	For C. Furness.
17 December	Unnamed	Fishing boat	Scott & Yule	Fraserburgh	United Kingdom	For Mr. Thompson.
18 December	W.H. Gilcher	Steamship	Cleveland Shipbuilding Company	Cleveland, Ohio	United States	For Gilchrist, Gilcher & Schuck.
20 December	Capitán Prat	Ironclad	Forges et Chantiers de la Méditerranée	La Seyne	France	For Chilean Navy.
20 December	Phlégéton	Phlégéton-class ironclad gunboat	Arsenal de Cherbourg	Cherbourg	France	For French Navy.
23 December	Justin	Steamship	Raylton Dixon & Co.	Middlesbrough	United Kingdom	For Bowring & Archibald.
23 December	Murtaja	Icebreaker	Bergsunds Mekaniska Verkstads	Stockholm	Sweden	For Finnish Board of Navigation.
24 December	Skjeld	Barque	Russell & Co.	Kingston	United Kingdom	For A. & F. Smith.
26 December	Kintuck	Steamship	Sir Raylton Dixon & Co.	Middlesbrough	United Kingdom	For China Shippers' Mutual Steam Navigation Co. Ltd.
26 December	Sophia Couppa	Steamship	Craig, Taylor & Co.	Stockton-on-Tees	United Kingdom	For private owner.
26 December	Taurus	Steamship	W. Gray & Co. (Ltd.)	West Hartlepool	United Kingdom	For Wilhelm Wilhelmsen.
27 December	Buckingham	Steamship	W. Gray & Co. (Limited)	Hartlepool	United Kingdom	For Christopher Furness.
27 December	Calcutta City	Steamship	Ropner & Son	Stockton-on-Tees	United Kingdom	For C. Furness.
27 December	Henry Dumois	Steamship	Grangemouth Dockyard Company	Grangemouth	United Kingdom	For Winge & Co.
27 December	Robert Duncan	Full-rigged ship	Robert Duncan & Co.	Port Glasgow	United Kingdom	For Robert Duncan Ship Company (Limited).
27 December	Sybille	Apollo-class cruiser	Robert Stephenson & Co.	Hebburn-on-Tyne	United Kingdom	For Royal Navy.
30 December	The Scot	Steamship	William Denny & Brothers	Dumbarton	United Kingdom	For Union Steamship Company.
December	Oldenburg	Steamship	Fairfield Shipbuilding and Engineering Company	Fairfield	United Kingdom	For Norddeutscher Lloyd.
December	Speke	Full-rigged ship	T. R. Oswald & Co.	Milford Haven	United Kingdom	For R. W. Leyland & Co.
December	Welcome Home	Fishing boat	J. & W. Mackintosh	Portessie	United Kingdom	For J. Riach.
Unknown date	Aillen	Sailing barge	Harland & Co.	Liverpool	United Kingdom	For private owner.
Unknown date	Alicia	Steam yacht	Harlan and Hollingsworth	Wilmington, Delaware	United States	For private owner.
Unknown date	Almirante Condell	Gunboat	Laird Bros.	Birkenhead	United Kingdom	For Chilean Navy.
Unknown date	Almy	Yacht	Harlan and Hollingsworth	Wilmington, Delaware	United States	For private owner.
Unknown date	Altona	Sternwheeler	David Stephenson	Portland, Oregon	United States	For Oregon City Transportation Company.
Unknown dater	Amur	Steamship	Strand Slipway Company	Sunderland	United Kingdom	For Amur Steamship Co. Ltd.
Unknown date	Annie M. Pence	Steamboat		Lummi Island, Washington	United States	For La Conner Trading and Transportation Company.
Unknown date	Armenia	Steamship	W. Gray & Co.	West Hartlepool	United Kingdom	For private owner.
Unknown date	Armeria	Lighthouse tender	Dialogue & Company	Camden, New Jersey	United States	For United States Lighthouse Board.
Unknown date	Aros	Steamship	James Laing	Sunderland	United Kingdom	For Aros Steamship Co. Ltd.
Unknown date	Aud	Steamship	Grangemouth Dockyard Company	Alloa	United Kingdom	For Trondhjem Dampgsskibselskab.
Unknown date	Bailey Gatzert	Sternwheeler	J. J. Holland	Ballard, Washington	United States	For John Leary.
Unknown date	Balear	Steamship	Strand Slipway Company	Sunderland	United Kingdom	For Sociedad General Mallorquina de Palama.
Unknown date	Balmore	Steamship	T & W Smith	South Shields	United Kingdom	For John Holt.
Unknown date	Benedick	Merchantman	Bartram, Haswell & Co.	Sunderland	United Kingdom	For C. Howard & Son.
Unknown date	Benjamin C. Cromwell	Schooner	Andrew J. York	South Portland, Maine	United States	For Andrew J. York.
Unknown date	Cabo Silleiro	Steamship	Joseph L. Thompson & Sons	Sunderland	United Kingdom	For Ybarra y Compania.
Unknown date	Calburga	Full-rigged ship	Adams MacDougall	South Maitland	Canada	For W. D. Nelson.
Unknown date	Calcutta City	Steamship	Ropner & Son.	Stockton on Tees	United Kingdom	For private owner.
Unknown date	Camperdown	Steamship	J. Blumer & Co	Sunderland	United Kingdom	For Steamship Camperdown Co. Ltd.
Unknown date	Cape Breton	Collier	Osbourne, Graham & Co.	North Hylton	United Kingdom	For Babcock & Radcliffe.
Unknown date	Carrier Dove	Schooner	Hall Brothers Marine Railroad & Shipbuilding Co.	Port Blakely, Washington	United States	For private owner.
Unknown date	Castlefield	Steamship	Richardson, Duck & Co.	South Stockton	United Kingdom	For private owner.
Unknown date	Caxo	Merchantman	Joseph L. Thompson & Sons	Sunderland	United Kingdom	For Corinthian Shipping Co. Ltd., or R. Nicholson & Sons.
Unknown date	Cecil	Steamship	R. Smith & Co.	Lytham	United Kingdom	For private owner.
Unknown date	Cecilia	Merchantman	John Priestman & Co.	Sunderland	United Kingdom	For E. F. Elliott.
Unknown date	Chelydra	Merchantman	Joseph L. Thompson & Sons	Sunderland	United Kingdom	For C. Hutchinson.
Unknown date	Cheriton	Steamship	John Priestman & Co.	Sunderland	United Kingdom	For Steamship Cheriton Co. Ltd.
Unknown date	Chicago	Merchantman	Short Brothers	Sunderland	United Kingdom	For W. & T. W. Pinkney.
Unknown date	Chusan	Steamship	Blohm & Voss	Hamburg	Germany	For Dampf Schiffahrt Gesellschäft Swatow.
Unknown date	Clyde	Steamship	W. Gray & Co.	West Hartlepool	United Kingdom	For private owner.
Unknown date	Craigmore	Merchantman	Bartram, Haswell & Co.	Sunderland	United Kingdom	For W. Johnston & Co.
Unknown date	Creole	Yacht	Forrest & Son	Wivenhoe	United Kingdom	For V. Bagot.
Unknown date	Crompton	Merchantman	Thomas Rayden & Sons	Liverpool	United Kingdom	For private owner.
Unknown date	Delfino	Submarine	Arsenale di La Spezia	La Spezia	Italy	For Regia Marina.
Unknown date	Denia	Steamship	Sunderland Shipbuilding Co. Ltd	Sunderland	United Kingdom	For Adam Brothers & Co.
Unknown date	Dimsdale	Full-rigged ship	Charles Joseph Bigger	Londonderry	United Kingdom	For Dale Line.
Unknown date	Drummond	Merchantman	Robert Thompson & Sons	Sunderland	United Kingdom	For Gillison & Chadwick.
Unknown date	Dunfermline	Merchantman	W. H. Potter & Sons	Liverpool	United Kingdom	For private owner.
Unknown date	Eagle	Gunboat	Harlan & Hollingsworth	Wilmington, Delaware	United States	For United States Navy.
Unknown date	Elloe	Steamship	W. Gray & Co.	West Hartlepool	United Kingdom	For private owner.
Unknown date	Emily P. Weed	Lake freighter		West Bay, Michigan	United States	For private owner.
Unknown date	Endeavour	Merchantman	Joseph L. Thompson & Sons	Sunderland	United Kingdom	For Rowland & Marwood.
Unknown date	Enterprise	Tug	J. H. Dialogue & Sons	Camden, New Jersey	United States	For private owner.
Unknown date	Etona	Steamship	Richardson, Duck & Co.	South Stockton	United Kingdom	For private owner.
Unknown date	Forest Holme	Merchantman	Joseph L. Thompson & Sons	Sunderland	United Kingdom	For Hine Bros.
Unknown date	France I	Barque	D. and W. Henderson and Company	Partick	United Kingdom	For Bordes et Fils.
Unknown date	Frieda	Steamship	W. Gray & Co.	West Hartlepool	United Kingdom	For private owner.
Unknown date	Fulham	Steamship	W. Gray & Co.	West Hartlepool	United Kingdom	For private owner.
Unknown date	George Allen	Merchantman	Short Bros.	Sunderland	United Kingdom	For James Westoll Line.
Unknown date	Gladys	Merchantman	S. P. Austin & Son	Sunderland	United Kingdom	For J. Coverdale & Son.
Unknown date	Grecian Prince	Merchantman	Short Bros.	Sunderland	United Kingdom	For James Knott.
Unknown date	Guernsey	Steamship	W. Gray & Co.	West Hartlepool	United Kingdom	For private owner.
Unknown date	Gypsum Queen	Tug	Dialogue & Company	Camden, New Jersey	United States	For United States Navy.
Unknown date	Halifax City	Steamship	W. Gray & Co.	West Hartlepool	United Kingdom	For private owner.
Unknown date	Hermann von Wissmann	Gunboat	Janssen & Schmilinsky	Hamburg	Germany	For Kaiserliche Marine.
Unknown date	Hesper	Steamship	Ropner & Son.	Stockton on Tees	United Kingdom	For private owner.
Unknown date	Horseman	Steam yacht	Laird Bros.	Birkenhead	United Kingdom	For private owner.
Unknown date	Hunslaw	Steamship	W. Gray & Co.	West Hartlepool	United Kingdom	For private owner.
Unknown date	Indrapura	Steamship	Thomas Rayden & Sons	Liverpool	United Kingdom	For private owner.
Unknown date	John Bull	Fishing trawler	John Bell	Grimsby	United Kingdom	For John Bell and others.
Unknown date	Joseph Davis	Steamship	Short Bros.	Sunderland	United Kingdom	For James Westoll Line.
Unknown date	Juteopolis	Barque	Caledon Shipbuilding & Engineering Co. Ltd.	Dundee	United Kingdom	For private owner.
Unknown date	Keemun	Merchantman	Joseph L. Thompson & Sons	Sunderland	United Kingdom	For China Shippers' Mutual Steam Navigation Co. Ltd.
Unknown date	Kingslands	Steamship	W. Gray & Co.	West Hartlepool	United Kingdom	For private owner.
Unknown date	Langoe	Steamship	W. Gray & Co.	West Hartlepool	United Kingdom	For private owner.
Unknown date	Le Calvados	Steamship	John Cockerill	Antwerp	Belgium	For Compagnie Générale Transatlantique.
Unknown date	Lexington	Steamship	Harlan & Hollingsworth	Chester, Pennsylvania	United States	For Colonial Navigation Co.
Unknown date	Limpopo	Gunboat			United Kingdom	For Portuguese Navy.
Unknown date	Llanberis	Steamship	Osbourne, Graham & Co	North Hylton	United Kingdom	For Llanberis Steamship Company Ltd.
Unknown date	Lyell	Steamship	Bartram, Haswell & Co.	Sunderland	United Kingdom	For Wilkie & Turnbull.
Unknown date	Malvern	Steamship	W. Gray & Co.	West Hartlepool	United Kingdom	For private owner.
Unknown date	Maori Prince	Merchantman	William Doxford & Sons	Sunderland	United Kingdom	For W. Ross & Co.
Unknown date	Marigold	Lighthouse tender			United States	For United States Lighthouse Service.
Unknown date	Marquis of Anglesey	Coaster	Edwards & Symes	Millwall	United Kingdom	For War Department.
Unknown date	Mascot	Tug		Philadelphia, Pennsylvania	United States	For private owner.
Unknown date	Mascot	Sternwheeler	Charles Bureau		United States	For Jacob Kamm.
Unknown date	Maverick	Steamship	Columbian Iron Works & Dry Dock Co.	Baltimore, Maryland	United States	For Standard Oil Company of New York.
Unknown date	May	Merchantman	John Priestman & Co.	Sunderland	United Kingdom	For Allwood & Co.
Unknown date	Melbourne	Merchantman	William Pickersgill & Sons	Sunderland	United Kingdom	For W. Kish.
Unknown date	Messapia	Steamship	Sunderland Shipbuilding Co. Ltd	Sunderland	United Kingdom	For Puglia Steam Navigation Co.
Unknown date	Miztec	Schooner	H. Ihnken & P. Lester	Marine City, Michigan	United States	For Marine Transit Co.
Unknown date	Montebello	Steamship	Richardson, Duck & Co.	South Stockton	United Kingdom	For private owner.
Unknown date	Morning Star	Humber Keel	Brown & Clapson	Barton-upon-Humber	United Kingdom	For George Hill.
Unknown date	Nathan F. Cobb	Schooner		Rockland, Maine	United States	For private owner.
Unknown date	Newby	Steamship	Ropner & Son.	Stockton on Tees	United Kingdom	For private owner.
Unknown date	Nithsdale	Merchantman	William Pickersgill & Sons	Sunderland	United Kingdom	For R. Mackill & Co.
Unknown date	Norse King	Steamship	James Laing	Sunderland	United Kingdom	For private owner.
Unknown date	Norseman	Steam yacht	Laird Brothers	Birkenhead	United Kingdom	For Samuel Radcliffe Platt.
Unknown date	Oaklands	Steamship	W. Gray & Co.	West Hartlepool	United Kingdom	For private owner.
Unknown date	Oberon	Merchantman	Bartram, Haswell & Co.	Sunderland	United Kingdom	For C. Howard & Sons.
Unknown date	Obidense	Steamship	Thomas Rayden & Sons	Liverpool	United Kingdom	For private owner.
Unknown date	Orfordness	Steamship	Richardson, Duck & Co.	South Stockton	United Kingdom	For private owner.
Unknown date	Ottoman	Steamship	Laird Bros.	Birkenhead	United Kingdom	For private owner.
Unknown date	Pakeha	Steamship	Ropner & Son.	Stockton on Tees	United Kingdom	For private owner.
Unknown date	Parkfield	Steamship	Joseph L. Thompson & Sons	Sunderland	United Kingdom	For Parkfield Steamship Co. Ltd.
Unknown date	Peleng-i Derya	Peleng-i Deryâ-class torpedo gunboat	Friedrich Krupp Germaniawerft	Kiel	Germany	For Ottoman Navy.
Unknown date	Princess	Firefighting tug	W. Allsup & Sons Ltd.	Preston	United Kingdom	For private owner.
Unknown date	Rangatira	Steamship	W. Gray & Co.	West Hartlepool	United Kingdom	For private owner.
Unknown date	Réaumur	Merchantman	William Doxford & Sons	Sunderland	United Kingdom	For A. d'Orbigny & Faustin Fils.
Unknown date	Regina	Merchantman	Short Bros.	Sunderland	United Kingdom	For Taylor & Sanderson.
Unknown date	Robert Eggleston	Steamship	Short Bros.	Sunderland	United Kingdom	For James Westoll Line.
Unknown date	Roman	Tug	George W. Brown & Sons	Hull	United Kingdom	For private owner.
Unknown date	Saladio	Steamship	Thomas Rayden & Sons	Liverpool	United Kingdom	For private owner.
Unknown date	Saturn	Collier	Harlan & Hollingsworth Company	Wilmington, Delaware	United States	For private owner.
Unknown date	Scart	Yacht	J. Allen & Co.	Poole	United Kingdom	For private owner.
Unknown date	Scot	Steamship	William Denny and Brothers	Dumbarton	United Kingdom	For Union Steamship Company.
Unknown date	Specialist	Merchantman	Strand Slipway Co.	Sunderland	United Kingdom	For Angler Shipping Co.
Unknown date	Stalheim	Steamship	John Priestman & Co.	Sunderland	United Kingdom	For Harloff & Bøe.
Unknown date	Stanley Force	Steamship	R. Williamson & Son	Workington	United Kingdom	For W. S. Kennaugh & Co.
Unknown date	Sumatra	Cruiser	Koninklijke Fabriek van Stoom -en andere Werktuigen	Amsterdam	Netherlands	For Royal Netherlands Navy.
Unknown date	Suomi	Steamship		Chinook, Washington	United Kingdom	For B. A. Seaborg.
Unknown date	Taurus	Steamship	W. Gray & Co.	West Hartlepool	United Kingdom	For private owner.
Unknown date	Ukiah	Ferry	San Francisco and North Pacific Railroad	Tiburon, California	United States	For San Francisco and North Pacific Railroad.
Unknown date	Umkuzi	Cargo liner	James Lain	Sunderland	United Kingdom	For Bullard, King & Company, Limited.
Unknown date	Umhloti	Steamship	W. Gray & Co.	West Hartlepool	United Kingdom	For private owner.
Unknown date	Uplands	Steamship	Ropner & Son.	Stockton on Tees	United Kingdom	For private owner.
Unknown date	Vala	Steamship	Richardson, Duck & Co.	South Stockton	United Kingdom	For private owner.
Unknown date	Valin	Merchantman	William Doxford & Sons	Sunderland	United Kingdom	For A. d'Orbigny & Faustin Fils.
Unknown date	Velzie	Yacht	Black & Co.	Southampton	United Kingdom	For Mr. Towers Clark.
Unknown date	Walter Adams	Fishing trawler	Robert Palmer & Son	Noank, Connecticut	United States	For private owner.
Unknown date	W.H. Harrison	Steamship	Paul Schrader	Alsea, Oregon	United States	For private owner.
Unknown date	Windor	Steamship	W. Gray & Co.	West Hartlepool	United Kingdom	For private owner.
Unknown date		Man-of-war	Laird Bros.	Birkenhead	United Kingdom	For Argentine Navy.
Unknown date	No. 378	Steamship	Richardson, Duck & Co.	South Stockton	United Kingdom	For private owner.
Unknown date	Three unnamed vessels	Thames barges	Richardson, Duck & Co.	South Stockton	United Kingdom	For private owners.
