= List of ship launches in 1891 =

The list of ship launches in 1891 includes a chronological list of some ships launched in 1891.

| Date | Ship | Class / type | Builder | Location | Country | Notes |
|---|---|---|---|---|---|---|
| 8 January | Cairnie | Steamship | Blyth Shipbuilding Co. Ltd | Blyth | United Kingdom | For W. Todd Moffatt. |
| 29 January | Silverstream | Barque | Charles Joseph Bigger | Londonderry | United Kingdom | For William Porter Herdman. |
| 10 February | Apollo | Apollo-class cruiser | Chatham Dockyard | Chatham, Kent | United Kingdom | For Royal Navy. |
| 11 February | Nomadic | Livestock carrier | Harland & Wolff | Belfast | United Kingdom | For White Star Line |
| 26 February | Royal Sovereign | Royal Sovereign-class battleship | Portsmouth Dockyard | Portsmouth | United Kingdom | For Royal Navy |
| February | Penpol | Steamer | Harvey and Co | Hayle | United Kingdom | For Messrs R B Chellew and Co |
| 7 March | Espagne | Steamship | Forges et Chantiers de la Méditerranée | La Seyne | France | For Soc. Générale de Transports Maritimes à Vapeur |
| 12 March | Tauric | Livestock carrier | Harland & Wolff | Belfast | United Kingdom | For White Star Line |
| 14 March | Gertie | Cargo ship | W. Allsup & Sons Ltd. | Preston | United Kingdom | For Champion & Co. |
| 28 March | Magnetic | Tender | Harland & Wolff | Belfast | United Kingdom | For White Star Line |
| 4 April | Falke | Bussard-class cruiser | Kaiserliche Werft | Kiel | Germany | For Imperial German Navy |
| 9 April | Croft | Steamship | Blyth Shipbuilding Co. Ltd | Blyth | United Kingdom | For Arrow Shipping Co. Ltd. |
| 9 April | Zaragoza | Cruiser | Forges et Chantiers de la Méditerranée | Le Havre | France | For the Mexican Navy |
| 11 April | Labrador | Passenger ship | Harland & Wolff | Belfast | United Kingdom | For Dominion Steamship Co. |
| 21 April | Ferndale | Barque | Charles Joseph Bigger | Londonderry | United Kingdom | For Dale Line. |
| 23 April | Europe | Lighter | Frederick Braby & Co. Ltd. | Deptford | United Kingdom | For B. Jacob & Sons. |
| 7 May | Empress of India | Royal Sovereign-class battleship | Pembroke Dockyard | Pembrokeshire | United Kingdom | For Royal Navy |
| 7 March | Seine | Steamship | Forges et Chantiers de la Méditerranée | Le Havre | France | For: London, Brighton and South Coast Railway |
| 9 May | Assaye | Cargo ship | Harland & Wolff | Belfast | United Kingdom | For Elder Dempster. |
| 16 May | Caradog | Barque | Messrs. P. Austin & Son | Sunderland | United Kingdom | For Messrs. William Morris & Co. |
| May | Clytie | Humber Keel | Brown & Clapson | Barton-upon-Humber | United Kingdom | For Codd & Pullen. |
| 6 June | Cheshire | Passenger ship | Harland & Wolff | Belfast | United Kingdom | For Bibby Steamship Co. |
| 6 June | Ramleh | Steamship | Harvey and Co | Hayle | United Kingdom | For the India and China trade. |
| 8 June | Kilorack | Steamship | Blyth Shipbuilding Co. Ltd | Blyth | United Kingdom | For Kilorack Steamship Co. Ltd. |
| 15 June | Asia | Lighter | Frederick Braby & Co. Ltd. | Deptford | United Kingdom | For B. Jacob & Sons. |
| 25 June | Beechdale | Barque | Charles Joseph Bigger | Londonderry | United Kingdom | For Dale Line. |
| 27 June | Shropshire | Passenger ship | Harland & Wolff | Belfast | United Kingdom | For Bibby Steamship Co. |
| 30 June | Kurfürst Friedrich Wilhelm | Brandenburg-class battleship | Kaiserliche Werft | Wilhemshaven | Germany | For Imperial German Navy |
| 16 July | Africa | Lighter | Frederick Braby & Co. Ltd. | Deptford | United Kingdom | For B. Jacob & Sons. |
| 25 July | Lancastrian | Cargo ship | Harland & Wolff | Belfast | United Kingdom | For F. Leyland & Co. |
| 30 July | Hood | Royal Sovereign-class battleship | Chatham Dockyard | Chatham | United Kingdom | For Royal Navy |
| 8 August | Parkdale | Barque | Charles Joseph Bigger | Londonderry | United Kingdom | For J. Henry Iredale Ltd. |
| 11 August | America | Lighter | Frederick Braby & Co. Ltd. | Deptford | United Kingdom | For B. Jacob & Sons. |
| 18 August | Unnamed | Barge | Blyth Shipbuilding Co. Ltd | Blyth | United Kingdom | For Warkworth Harbour Commission. |
| 20 August | Philadelphian | Cargo ship | Harland & Wolff | Belfast | United Kingdom | For F. Leyland & Co. |
| 22 August | Santa Marinha | Tug | W. Allsup & Sons Ltd. | Preston | United Kingdom | For Companhia de Materiaes e Melhoramentos da Cidade do Rio de Janeiro. |
| 22 August | Styx | Phlégéton-class gunboat | Arsenal de Cherbourg | Cherbourg | France | For French Navy |
| 24 August | Mandarin | Steamship | Blyth Shipbuilding Co. Ltd | Blyth | United Kingdom | For Whiteleaf Steamship Co. Ltd. |
| 25 August | El Callao | Steamship | Forges et Chantiers de la Méditerranée | Le Havre | France | For Soc. Générale pour le dévelopment du Commerce et de l'Industrie |
| 21 September | Brandenburg | Brandenburg-class battleship | AG Vulcan | Stettin | Germany | For Imperial German Navy |
| 8 September | Torpilleur N° 164 | 36-metre type Normand (1890 tranche), (Type 126 Modifié) | Forges et Chantiers de la Méditerranée | Le Havre | France | For the French Navy |
| 18 September | Éclaire | Eclaire-class seagoing torpedo boat | Forges et Chantiers de la Méditerranée | La Seyne | France | For: French Navy |
| 27 September | Kabyle II | Eclaire-class seagoing torpedo boat | Forges et Chantiers de la Méditerranée | La Seyne | France | For: French Navy |
| 15 October | Orage | Eclaire-class seagoing torpedo boat | Forges et Chantiers de la Méditerranée | La Seyne | France | For: French Navy |
| 17 October | Brennus | Pre-dreadnought battleship | Arsenal de Lorient | Lorient | France | For French Navy |
| 17 October | Pindari | Cargo ship | Harland & Wolff | Belfast | United Kingdom | For T. & J. Brocklebank. |
| 21 October | Mashona | Full-rigged ship | Charles Joseph Bigger | Londonderry | United Kingdom | For W. Lowdon & Co. |
| 28 October | Skinningrove | Steamship | Wood, Skinner & Co. | Newcastle upon Tyne | United Kingdom | For Skinningrove Iron Co. Ltd. |
| 29 October | Chasseloup-Laubat | Friant-class cruiser | Arsenal de Cherbourg | Cherbourg | France | For French Navy |
| 31 October | Ionia | Cargo ship | Harland & Wolff | Belfast | United Kingdom | For D. & C. McIver. |
| 2 November | George | Cargo ship | W. Allsup & Sons Ltd. | Preston | United Kingdom | For Joseph J. Crossfield & Sons. |
| 4 November | Véloce | Véloce-class seagoing torpedo boat | Forges et Chantiers de la Méditerranée | La Seyne | France | For: French Navy |
| 19 November | Mahratta | Cargo ship | Harland & Wolff | Belfast | United Kingdom | For Brocklebank Line |
| 30 November | Torpilleur N° 165 | 36-metre type Normand (1890 tranche), (Type 126 Modifié) | Forges et Chantiers de la Méditerranée | Le Havre | France | For the French Navy |
| 14 December | Weissenburg | Brandenburg-class battleship | AG Vulcan | Stettin | Germany | For Imperial German Navy |
| 17 December | Massachusetts | Passenger ship | Harland & Wolff | Belfast | United Kingdom | For Baltimore Lighterage Co. |
| Unknown date | Alexandra | Yacht | J. Allen & Co. | Poole | United Kingdom | For Frederick Griffin. |
| Unknown date | Black Rock | Cargo ship | R. Williamson & Son | Whitehaven | United Kingdom | For private owner. |
| Unknown date | Britannia | Fishing trawler | John Bell | Grimsby | United Kingdom | For John Bell and others. |
| Unknown date | Clive | Tug | Barry Graving Dock & Engineering Company | Barry | United Kingdom | For Barry Railway. |
| Unknown date | Craiglands | Barque | Charles Joseph Bigger | Londonderry | United Kingdom | For Sailing Ship Craiglands Co. Ltd. |
| Unknown date | Enterprise | Schooner | Bessy & Palmer | Great Yarmouth | United Kingdom | For Bessey & Palmer. |
| Unknown date | Humber | Steamship | W. Allsup & Sons Ltd. | Preston | United Kingdom | For private owner. |
| Unknown date | Lawhill | Barque | Caledon Shipbuilding & Engineering Co. Ltd. | Dundee | United Kingdom | For private owner. |
| Unknown date | Ravenswood | Paddle steamer | Ailsa Shipbuilding Co Ltd. | Troon | United Kingdom | For P. & A. Campbell. |
| Unknown date | Ruthenia | Twin-screw steamer | Armstrong & Co | River Tyne | United Kingdom | For McIvers, Liverpool, for the Australian trade. |
| Unknown date | Stormcock | Tug | David Banks & Co. | Plymouth | United Kingdom | For John Westcott, Joseph C. Cock and another. |
