= Portuguese gunboat Diu =

Gunboat of the Portuguese Navy

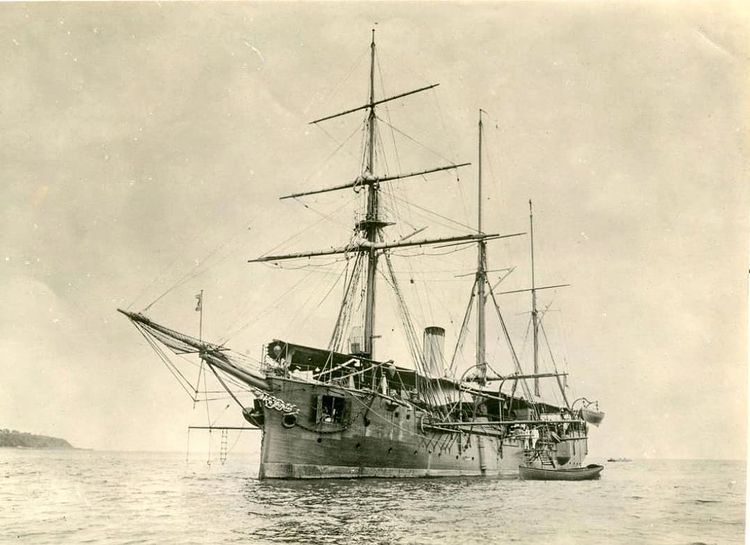
- The Diu in Lourenço Marques, nowadays Maputo, in 1912.

History

Portugal
- Name: Diu
- Builder: Portuguese Navy
- Laid down: 6 June 1887
- Launched: 27 August 1899
- Decommissioned: 1913

General characteristics
- Type: Gunboat
- Displacement: 706 tons
- Length: 43 m
- Beam: 8.4 m
- Installed power: 700 h.p
- Armament: 6 guns

Diu was a Beira-class Portuguese steam and sail gunboat in service with the Portuguese Navy between 1889 and 1913. It displaced 706 tons when loaded, had 6 guns, and a 700hp engine. It was laid down on the 6 of June 1887 at Arsenal da Marinha in Lisbon and launched on the 27 of August 1899 before a crowd that included the minister of the navy Ressano Garcia and Crown prince Dom Afonso.

It was 43 meters long, 8,40m beam, a draft of 5,60m, and weighted 640 tons. It was built out of oak, teak and steel. It was calculated to reach a speed of 12 knots and its crew was 108. It was equipped with 6 Krupp guns, one 5.9 in., two 4.7 in, and 3 smaller.

The Diu saw service around the world. Posted to Macau and participated in a coastal bombardment action in Timor.

== See also ==
- Portuguese gunboat Limpopo
- Portuguese gunboat Pátria
