= SS Mechelin =

SS Mechelin is the name of the following ships:

- SS Mechelin (1890), launched 18 July 1890
- SS Mechelin (1895), scrapped in 1971
