= SS Vadala =

British-built merchant ship

History
- Name: 1890: Vadala; 1913: Kenkon Maru No. 12
- Owner: 1890: British India SN Co; 1913: Inui Gomei Kasha
- Operator: 1913: Inui Shinbei
- Port of registry: 1890: (United Kingdom) Glasgow; 1913: (Japan) Dairen
- Route: 1900: Calcutta – Hong Kong
- Builder: Wm Denny & Bros, Dumbarton
- Cost: £59,600
- Yard number: 440
- Launched: 4 August 1890
- Completed: 13 September 1890
- Maiden voyage: 16 September 1890
- Identification: UK official number 98575; 1890: code letters LVKP; 1917: code letters QBJL
- Fate: sank after collision, 1928

General characteristics
- Type: cargo ship
- Tonnage: 3,334 GRT, 2,164 NRT, 4,993 DWT
- Length: 340.0 ft (103.6 m)
- Beam: 43.1 ft (13.1 m)
- Depth: 26.0 ft (7.9 m)
- Decks: 3
- Installed power: 315 NHP, 1,800 ihp
- Propulsion: 1 × quadruple-expansion engine; 1 × screw
- Speed: 10 knots (19 km/h)
- Capacity: cargo: 200,030 cubic feet (5,664 m^{3}); passengers: 18 × 1st class
- Crew: 54
- Notes: sister ship: Virawa

SS Vadala was a cargo steamship that was launched in Scotland in 1890, renamed Kenkon Maru No. 12 in 1913, and sank as the result of a collision in 1928. She was built for the British India Steam Navigation Company (BI). In 1895 she took Indian indentured labourers to Fiji. In 1899 was a troop ship in the Second Boer War. From 1913 she was in Japanese ownership.

== Building ==
In 1890 William Denny and Brothers of Dumbarton on the River Leven built a pair of sister ships for BI for £59,600 each. Yard number 440 was launched on 4 August as Vadala and completed on 13 September. Yard number 441 was launched on 15 September as Virawa and completed that October.

Vadala's registered length was 340.0 ft (103.6 m), her beam was 43.1 ft (13.1 m) and her depth was 26.0 ft (7.9 m). Her tonnages were 3,334 GRT, 2,164 NRT, and 4,993 DWT. Her holds had capacity for 200,030 cubic feet (5,664 m^{3}) of cargo, and she had berths for 18 first class passengers.

Vadala had a single screw, driven by a quadruple-expansion steam engine. It was rated at 315 NHP or 1,800 ihp, and gave her a speed of 10 knots (19 km/h).

== Vadala ==
BI registered Vadala at Glasgow. Her United Kingdom official number was 98575 and her code letters were LVKP.

On 21 February 1895 Vadala left Calcutta carrying 767 Indian indentured labourers to Fiji. On her voyage a measles epidemic killed 14 of her passengers. On 26 March she reached Suva, where she was quarantined.

All BI ships were designed to be converted into troop ships, by putting troop accommodation in the holds. In the Second Boer War the UK Government chartered at least 37 BI ships for war service. On 21 September 1899 Vadala left Bombay (now Mumbai) carrying a squadron of the 19th Royal Hussars. She reached Durban on 7 October.

From July 1900 BI put Vadala on its route between Calcutta and Hong Kong.

== Kenkon Maru No. 12 ==
In 1913 Inui Gomei Kasha bought Vadala for £12,000, and renamed her Kenkon Maru No. 12. She was registered at Dairen in the Kwantung Leased Territory, and her code letters were QBJL.

On 30 May 1928 Kenkon Maru No. 12 was involved in a collision with the Chinese steamship Hawchan in the Straits of Tsingtao (now Qingdao), about 140 nautical miles (260 km) east-southeast of Tsingtao.

== See also ==
- List of Indian indenture ships to Fiji

== Bibliography ==
- Haws, Duncan (1987). British India S.N. Co. Merchant Fleets. Vol. 11. Burwash: Travel Creatours Ltd Publications. ISBN 0-946378-07-X.
- Lloyd's Register of British and Foreign Shipping. Vol. I.–Steamers. London: Lloyd's Register of Shipping. 1891 – via Internet Archive.
- Lloyd's Register of Shipping. Vol. II.–Steamers. London: Lloyd's Register of Shipping. 1917 – via Internet Archive.
- Mercantile Navy List. London. 1891 – via Crew List Index Project.
