= Newell A. Eddy (schooner) =

Shipwreck of a three-masted schooner in Lake Huron, Michigan, United States

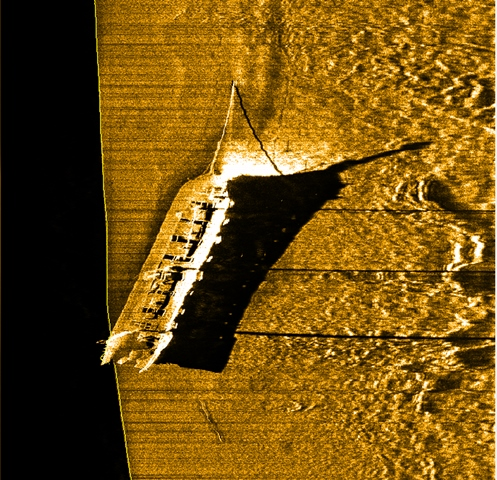
- Side scan image of Newell A. Eddy

History

United States
- Name: Newell A. Eddy
- Operator: Eddy Transportation Co. (aka Hampton Transportation Co.)
- Builder: Frank W. Wheeler & Co.
- Launched: 6 May 1890
- Completed: 1890
- In service: 1890
- Out of service: 22 April 1893
- Identification: Official number 130467
- Fate: Foundered in storm, 22 April 1893

General characteristics
- Type: Three‑masted wooden schooner
- Tonnage: 1270 gross tons
- Length: 242 ft (74 m)
- Beam: 39.7 ft (12.1 m)
- Propulsion: Sail (unpowered; towed as consort)
- Capacity: Grain (wheat)
- Notes: Built for grain trade in “consort system”; towed by steamer Charles A. Eddy

Newell A. Eddy was a large three‑masted wooden schooner built in 1890 at West Bay City, Michigan by Frank W. Wheeler & Co. (also referred to in records as Hampton Transportation Co. or Eddy Transportation Co.). Official number 130467. The vessel measured approximately 242 ft in length with a beam of about 39.7 ft and a gross tonnage of around 1270 tons. She was used in the grain (wheat) trade, towed in a “consort system” by the steamer Charles A. Eddy across the Great Lakes.

== Description ==
Newell A. Eddy was a three‑masted wooden schooner of 1,270 gross register tons, built in 1890 by Frank W. Wheeler & Co. at West Bay City, Michigan. She measured about 242 ft (74 m) long and had a 39.7 ft (12.1 m) beam, with no engine of her own, relying on towing in a consort arrangement.

== Final voyage and wreck ==
On 22 April 1893, while being towed by the steamer Charles A. Eddy and bound for Buffalo, New York, with a cargo of wheat, the tow line parted during a severe storm near the Straits of Mackinac off Cheboygan, Michigan. The unpowered Newell A. Eddy broke free, drifted, and is believed to have struck Spectacle Reef before foundering with all hands.

== The wreck ==
The wreck of Newell A. Eddy was discovered in 1992 by a research team from the University of Michigan (the vessel Laurentian). It lies upright and largely intact in approximately 160–168 feet (49–51 m) of water in Lake Huron, near Bois Blanc Island, with its three masts still standing. On site are visible features including capstans (including an engraved capstan cover), a donkey boiler, bowsprit, centerboard winch, though the aft cabin, wheel, transom and rudder are missing. The wreck has become a popular dive site at 45°46.885′N 84°13.817′W.

== See also ==
- List of shipwrecks in the Thunder Bay National Marine Sanctuary
