= John Priestman =

Sir John Priestman, 1st Baronet (22 March 1855 – 5 August 1941) was a British shipbuilder and charitable benefactor.

== Life ==
Priestman was born in Bishop Auckland, County Durham, the son of Robert Priestman (1824–1867), a baker, and Jane Smith (c.1830–1903).

Aged 14, Priestman became an apprentice to John Blumer, a shipbuilder at Sunderland, and later became chief draughtsman at W. Pickersgill & Sons. In 1882, he set up his own yard at Castletown. He married Naomi Huntly (1857–1908) in 1881 at Sunderland.

Priestman was gazetted a Knight Bachelor for "public and political services in Sunderland" in the 1923 Birthday Honours and was knighted at Buckingham Palace by George V on 25 July. He was further gazetted a baronet, of Monkwearmouth in the County of Durham, for "services to many social organisations in Durham" on 1 June 1934 and his letters patent were issued on 30 June.

Priestman died in 1941, aged 86. As he died without male heirs, his baronetcy became extinct.

== Benefactor ==
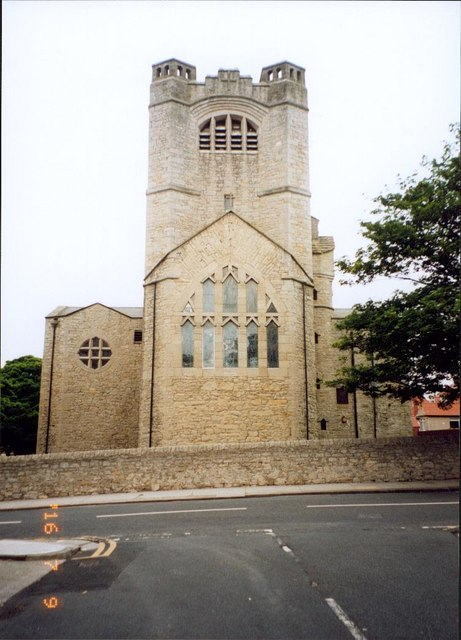
St Andrew's, Roker built in memory of John Priestman's mother

Priestman donated £6000 to the building of St Andrew's Church, Roker (completed in 1907), which was built in memory to his mother. In 1931, he established the Sir John Priestman Trust, whose purposes included 'feeding of poor... in times of distress', the 'employment and payment of nurses for the sick and infirm' and the building, 'maintaining and furnishing (including provision of organs)' of 'churches and mission halls and schools'. In 1933 he donated £35,000 to the rebuilding of St Michael's Church, Sunderland, he paid for the building of St Wilfrid's Church, Halton, Leeds (built 1937–39) and in 1939 he financed £20,000 for the construction of the Priestman Building, originally a library for Sunderland Technical College and now part of the University of Sunderland.

== Sources ==
- Grace's Guide: The Best of Engineering. 1750-1960s, John Priestman and Co
- The Sunderland Site – Page 053, Shipbuilders – Page 17
- A walk through Bishopwearmouth Conservation Area
- Purchasing Power of British Pounds from 1264 to Present

Baronetage of the United Kingdom
New title	Baronet (of Monkwearmouth); 1934–1941	Extinct
