= Grangemouth Dockyard Company =

The Grangemouth Dockyard Company was a British shipbuilding and ship repair firm located at Grangemouth, on the Firth of Forth, Scotland.

== History ==
The company was established in Grangemouth by William Miller and Samuel Popham Jackson in 1885. SS Vaitarna was the first ship constructed by the company. In 1887 the yard was visited by Andrew Carnegie and his new wife Louise. While there they witnessed the christening and launch of the Mexican steamer Tabasqueño, after which Carnegie gave a speech at the luncheon that followed. The company acquired another two yards in 1888, located in Alloa and Ardrossan. This was followed by the acquisition of a yard in Greenock in 1900, and the merging of the company with the pre-existing Greenock Dockyard Company. After eight years the company was incorporated as the Greenock & Grangemouth Dockyard Co. The Greenock yard was then sold to Cayzer, Irvine & Company, the operators of the Clan Line, in 1918. In 1920 the Greenock yard was itself incorporated as the Greenock Dockyard Co Ltd, while upon the split in 1918 the Grangemouth-based yard became the Grangemouth Dockyard Co Ltd. The company continued to build merchant ships and some naval vessels during the Second World War, eventually producing 31 new ships during the war. 14 of the ships present at the Normandy Landings had been built at Grangemouth, while another 44 were repaired there. The facilities were also used to repair and maintain submarines of the Royal Netherlands Navy.

The company continued to operate after the war, becoming part of Swan Hunter in 1967. The company ceased building ships in 1972, thereafter concentrating solely on ship repair. With the large scale nationalisation of British shipbuilding in the late 1970s Swan Hunter became part of British Shipbuilders, with the Grangemouth Dockyard Company as a subsidiary. The winding up of operations in the 1980s saw the re-emergence of the Grangemouth Dockyard Company as a private concern in 1984, but it was subsequently liquidated in 1987.

Records and documents relating to the company and its activities are held by the National Archives of Scotland, and Falkirk Museums.
