= SS Lexington (1890) =

American Passenger ship

Coordinates: 40°42′28″N 73°59′32″W

History
- Name: (United States) Washington (1890-1910); (United States) Lexington (1910-1935)
- Owner: Colonial Nav. Co.
- Port of registry: New York City, United States
- Builder: Harlan & Hollingsworth
- Yard number: 258
- Completed: 1890
- Acquired: 1890
- In service: 1890
- Identification: WBCZ; Official number: 81310
- Fate: Collided with Jane Christenson and sunk 2 January 1935

General characteristics
- Type: Passenger ship
- Tonnage: 1,249 GRT
- Length: 75 metres (246 ft 1 in)
- Beam: 14 metres (45 ft 11 in)
- Depth: 4.7 metres (15 ft 5 in)
- Installed power: 1 x 3-cyl. triple expansion engine
- Propulsion: Screw propeller
- Speed: 15 knots
- Capacity: 150 Passengers
- Crew: 51

SS Lexington was an American Passenger ship that collided with Jane Christenson and sank on 2 January 1935 on the East River in New York City while carrying general cargo and 201 passengers and crew from New York to Providence, Rhode Island.

== Construction ==
Lexington was built at the Harlan & Hollingsworth shipyard in Wilmington, Delaware in 1890. Where she was launched and completed that same year. The ship was 75 metres (246 ft 1 in) long, had a beam of 14 metres (45 ft 11 in) and a depth of 4.7 metres (15 ft 5 in). She was assessed at 1,249 GRT and had 1 x 3-cyl. Triple expansion engine driving a single screw propeller. The ship could reach a maximum speed of 15 knots.

== Sinking ==
Lexington left New York City on a voyage to Providence, Rhode Island on 2 January 1935 while carrying a general cargo and 201 passengers and crew. While she was steaming along the East River to reach Long Island Sound, the ship collided with the SS Jane Christenson. The Jane Christenson broke the Lexington in half and sank her in the shallow waters, resulting in the death of 6 crew members. The 195 survivors were led back to shore and the Jane Christenson's damage was repaired, after which she continued service until 1967. The crash occurred opposite the foot of Pike Street, near the Manhattan Bridge.

== Wreck ==
The partly sunken wreck was scrapped as it posed a danger to other ships in the river.
