= French ironclad gunboat Phlégéton =

History

France
- Name: Phlégéton
- Ordered: 5 August 1882
- Builder: Arsenal de Cherbourg
- Laid down: March 1885
- Launched: 20 December 1890
- Completed: October 1892
- Decommissioned: 15 October 1909
- Stricken: 2 August 1916
- Fate: Sunk as a target, 1917

General characteristics (as built)
- Class & type: Phlégéton-class ironclad gunboat
- Displacement: 1,796 t (1,768 long tons)
- Length: 59.2 m (194 ft 3 in) (o/a)
- Beam: 12.3 m (40 ft 4 in)
- Draft: 3.8 m (12 ft 6 in)
- Installed power: 4 locomotive boilers; 1,700 ihp (1,300 kW)
- Propulsion: 2 propellers, 2 compound-expansion steam engines
- Speed: 13 knots (24 km/h; 15 mph)
- Range: 1,800 nmi (3,300 km; 2,100 mi) at 8 knots (15 km/h; 9.2 mph)
- Complement: 99
- Armament: 1 × single 274 mm (10.8 in) gun; 1 × single 138.6 mm (5.5 in) gun; 2 × single 47 mm (1.9 in) guns; 3 × 5-barrel 37 mm (1.5 in) revolver cannon; 2 × single 37 mm (1.5 in) guns
- Armor: Waterline belt: 200 mm (7.9 in); Turret: 200 mm (7.9 in); Barbette: 200 mm (7.9 in); Deck (ship): 20 mm (0.8 in)

Phlégéton was one of two Phlégéton-class ironclad gunboats built for the French Navy during the 1880s. Completed in 1892, she spent most of her career in reserve. The ship was sunk as a target in 1917.

== Bibliography ==
- Campbell, N. J. M. (1979). "France". In Chesneau, Roger & Kolesnik, Eugene M. (eds.). Conway's All the World's Fighting Ships 1860–1905. Mayflower Books. pp. 283–333. ISBN 0-8317-0302-4.
- Roberts, Stephen S. (2021). French Warships in the Age of Steam 1859–1914: Design, Construction, Careers and Fates. Seaforth Publishing. ISBN 978-1-5267-4533-0.
- Roche, Jean-Michel (2005). Dictionnaire des bâtiments de la flotte de guerre française de Colbert à nos jours [Dictionary of French Warships from Colbert to Today] (in French). Vol. Tome I: 1671–1870. Roche. ISBN 978-2-9525917-0-6. OCLC 165892922.
