= RFA Growler (1890) =

History
- Name: Marquis of Anglesey (1890–1914); Growler (1914–22); Branksea (1922–43)
- Owner: War Department (1890–1914); Admiralty (1914–21); Henry J. Beazley (1921—22); William A. Wilson (1922–27); Branksea Steamship Co. Ltd (1927-28); Dundee Sand & Lighterage Co. Ltd. (1928-39); Tay Sand Co. Ltd. (1939–40)
- Operator: As owner, except; G. I. Corbou (1927–28); Charles M. Murdock (1928–39)
- Port of registry: (United Kingdom of Great Britain and Ireland) , United Kingdom (1890–1914); Royal Fleet Auxiliary (1914–21); (United Kingdom of Great Britain and Ireland) Southampton, United Kingdom (1921–27); (United Kingdom) London (1927–28); (United Kingdom) Dundee (1928–40)
- Builder: Edwards & Symes
- Launched: 1890
- Identification: United Kingdom Official Number 145367; Pennant Number X29 (1914–19); Code Letters GRSK (1919–34); Code Letters MLBW (1934–40)
- Fate: Sank

General characteristics
- Class & type: Coaster
- Tonnage: 214 GRT, 91 NRT
- Length: 112 feet 3 inches (34.21 m)
- Beam: 21 feet 1 inch (6.43 m)
- Depth: 9 feet 1 inch (2.77 m)
- Installed power: Compound steam engine, 32nhp
- Propulsion: Twin screw propellers

RFA Growler was a coastal stores and ammunition carrier built in 1890 by Edwards & Symes in Millwall, London as the War Department ship Marquis of Anglesey. It served with the Royal Fleet Auxiliary from 1914–22 as Growler and was then sold into merchant service, serving as Branksea until sinking in 1940.

== Description ==
The ship was 112 feet 3 inches (34.21 m) long, with a beam of 21 feet 1 inch (6.43 m) and a depth of 9 feet 1 inch (2.77 m). It was powered by a 32nhp 2-cylinder compound steam engine, which had cylinders of 12 inches (30 cm) and 22 inches (56 cm) diameter by 16 inches (41 cm) stroke. The single compound steam engine was built by Wilson & Co., London, and drove twin screw propellers.

== History ==
Marquis of Anglesey was built as yard number 220 by Edwards & Symes, Millwall, London in 1890. It entered service with the War Department in October 1891. In 1914, during World War I, it was transferred to the Royal Fleet Auxiliary, serving as RFA Growler. The Pennant number X29 was allocated. The Code Letters GRSK were allocated in 1919.

On 30 November 1921, Growler was sold out of service to Henry J. Beazley, Southampton, Hampshire, renamed Branksea and allocated the British official number 145367 in 1922. The ship was sold to William A. Wilson, Southampton in 1922. In 1927, it was sold to the Branksea Steamship Co. Ltd., London, managed by Gustave I. Corbou. On 31 August 1927, Branksea came ashore at Lannacombe, Devon whilst on a voyage from Par, Cornwall to Terneuzen, South Holland, Netherlands. The Torbay lifeboat rescued the five crew. It was refloated on 8 September. The ship was sold to the Dundee Sand & Lighterage Co. Ltd., Dundee, Perthshire on 2 May 1928 and operated under the management of Charles M. Murdock.

About the time that Branksea was sold to Dundee, it experienced an issue with its propulsion system and became adrift in the North Sea off the mouth of the River Tyne whilst on a voyage from Dartmouth, Devon to Dundee. The ship was discovered 60 nautical miles (110 km) out to sea by the fishing trawler Edinburgh Castle and was towed in to Dundee, arriving on 14 May. In 1934, the Code Letters MLBW were allocated. On 6 February 1935, a small fire occurred on board Branksea while berthed in the Earl Grey Dock, Dundee. The fire was quickly extinguished. The ship sprang a leak and sank in the Earl Grey Dock on 5 December 1935. One of the two people on board was killed. The other was alerted that the ship was sinking by the mewing of a cat and left the ship before it sank. It was refloated two days later. Branksea was sold to the Tay Sand Co. Ltd., Dundee in 1939. On 20 August 1940, while in tow of the tug Prizeman, it sank 3 nautical miles (5.6 km) off Girdleness, Aberdeenshire (57°00′N 2°20′W). The cause is unknown, and no lives were lost.
