= French ironclad gunboat Styx =

History

France
- Name: Styx
- Ordered: 5 August 1882
- Builder: Arsenal de Cherbourg
- Laid down: September 1889
- Launched: 22 August 1891
- Completed: March 1893
- Stricken: 30 October 1919
- Fate: Sold for scrap, 19 December 1919

General characteristics (as built)
- Class & type: Phlégéton-class ironclad gunboat
- Displacement: 1,796 t (1,768 long tons)
- Length: 59.2 m (194 ft 3 in) (o/a)
- Beam: 12.3 m (40 ft 4 in)
- Draft: 3.8 m (12 ft 6 in)
- Installed power: 4 locomotive boilers; 1,700 ihp (1,300 kW)
- Propulsion: 2 propellers, 2 compound-expansion steam engines
- Speed: 13 knots (24 km/h; 15 mph)
- Range: 1,800 nmi (3,300 km; 2,100 mi) at 8 knots (15 km/h; 9.2 mph)
- Complement: 99
- Armament: 1 × single 274 mm (10.8 in) gun; 1 × single 138.6 mm (5.5 in) gun; 2 × single 47 mm (1.9 in) guns; 3 × 5-barrel 37 mm (1.5 in) revolver cannon; 2 × single 37 mm (1.5 in) guns
- Armor: Waterline belt: 200 mm (7.9 in); Turret: 200 mm (7.9 in); Barbette: 200 mm (7.9 in); Deck (ship): 20 mm (0.8 in)

Styx was one of two Phlégéton-class ironclad gunboats built for the French Navy during the 1880s. Completed in 1893, she was transferred to Saigon (now Ho Chi Minh City), French Indochina, shortly afterward. The ship was sold for scrap in 1919.

== Bibliography ==
- Campbell, N. J. M. (1979). "France". In Chesneau, Roger & Kolesnik, Eugene M. (eds.). Conway's All the World's Fighting Ships 1860–1905. Mayflower Books. pp. 283–333. ISBN 0-8317-0302-4.
- Roberts, Stephen S. (2021). French Warships in the Age of Steam 1859–1914: Design, Construction, Careers and Fates. Seaforth Publishing. ISBN 978-1-5267-4533-0.
- Roche, Jean-Michel (2005). Dictionnaire des bâtiments de la flotte de guerre française de Colbert à nos jours [Dictionary of French Warships from Colbert to Today] (in French). Vol. Tome I: 1671–1870. Roche. ISBN 978-2-9525917-0-6. OCLC 165892922.
