= Vizcaya (1890 ship) =

Steam freighter

History

Commonwealth of the Philippines United States
- Name: Chusan (1890–1900); Vizcaya (1900–1941)
- Owner: Dampf Schifffahrt Gesellchäft Swatow (1890–1896); Chine Sische Kustenfahr Gesellchäft (1896–1900); Mendezona & Cia (1900–1902); Compania Maritima (1902–1908); Ynchausti y Compañía (1908–1935); Manila Steamship Company (1935–1938); Madrigal Steamship Company (1938–1941)
- Builder: Blohm & Voss
- Launched: 1890
- Home port: Hamburg, Germany (1890–1900); Manila, Philippines (1900–1941)
- Fate: Scuttled, December 1941

General characteristics
- Type: freighter
- Tonnage: 1,007 GRT
- Length: 216 ft 0 in (65.84 m) registry length
- Beam: 31 ft 0 in (9.45 m)
- Draft: 12 ft 0 in (3.66 m)
- Installed power: 115 hp
- Propulsion: T3 Cy. 15',24" 39"-33"

SS Vizcaya (ex-Chusan) was a steel-hulled, steam freighter that operated in the Commonwealth of the Philippines. She was scuttled at Manila in December 1941.

== History ==
She was built as the SS Chusan in 1890 for the benefit of Dampf Schifffahrt Gesellchäft Swatow (Swatow Steam Shipping Company) by Blohm & Voss at their Hamburg, Germany shipyard. In 1896, she was sold to Chine Sische Kustenfahr Gesellchäft; her port of registry remained Hamburg. In 1900, she was renamed as Vizcaya after her sale to Mendezona & Cia of the Philippines; her homeport was change to Manila. In 1902, she was sold to Compania Maritima of the Philippines. In 1908, she was sold to Ynchausti y Compañía. In 1935, she was sold to the Manila Steamship Company. In 1938, she was sold to the Madrigal Steamship Company, one of 19 intracoastal steamers that plied the interior waterways of the Philippines delivering foodstuffs and lumber for the company.

Immediately prior to the outbreak of hostilities with Japan, she arrived in Manila from the Visayas Islands with a contingent of soldiers and cargo and took shelter in Manila Harbor where the Asiatic Fleet was sheltered. After the Japanese seized Manila, she was scuttled and beached in the north harbor to prevent capture sometime in December 1941. The Japanese were unable to refloat her for use.
