= Robert Duncan and Company =

- Industry: Shipbuilding
- Predecessor: John Wood and Company
- Founded: 1830; 196 years ago
- Founder: Robert Duncan
- Defunct: 1915
- Fate: Takeover
- Successor: Roberts & Co (Lithgows)
- Headquarters: Glasgow, Scotland

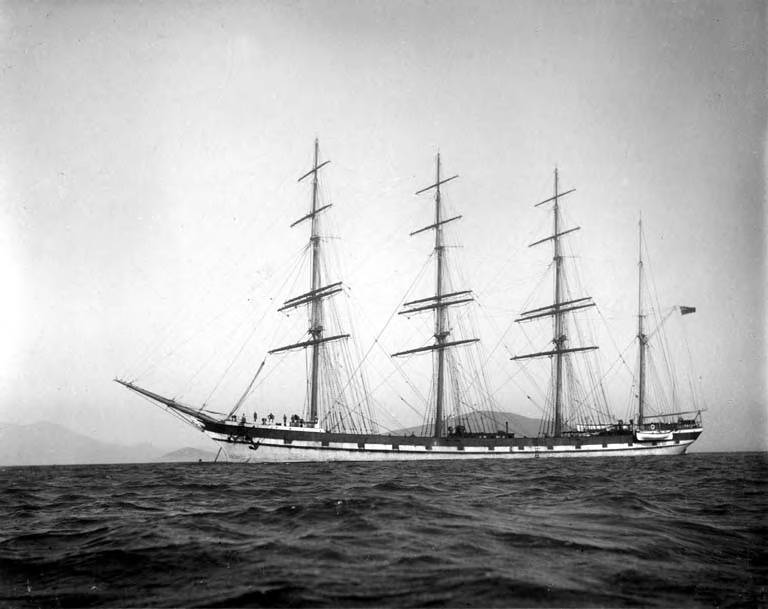
Four-masted bark Robert Duncan

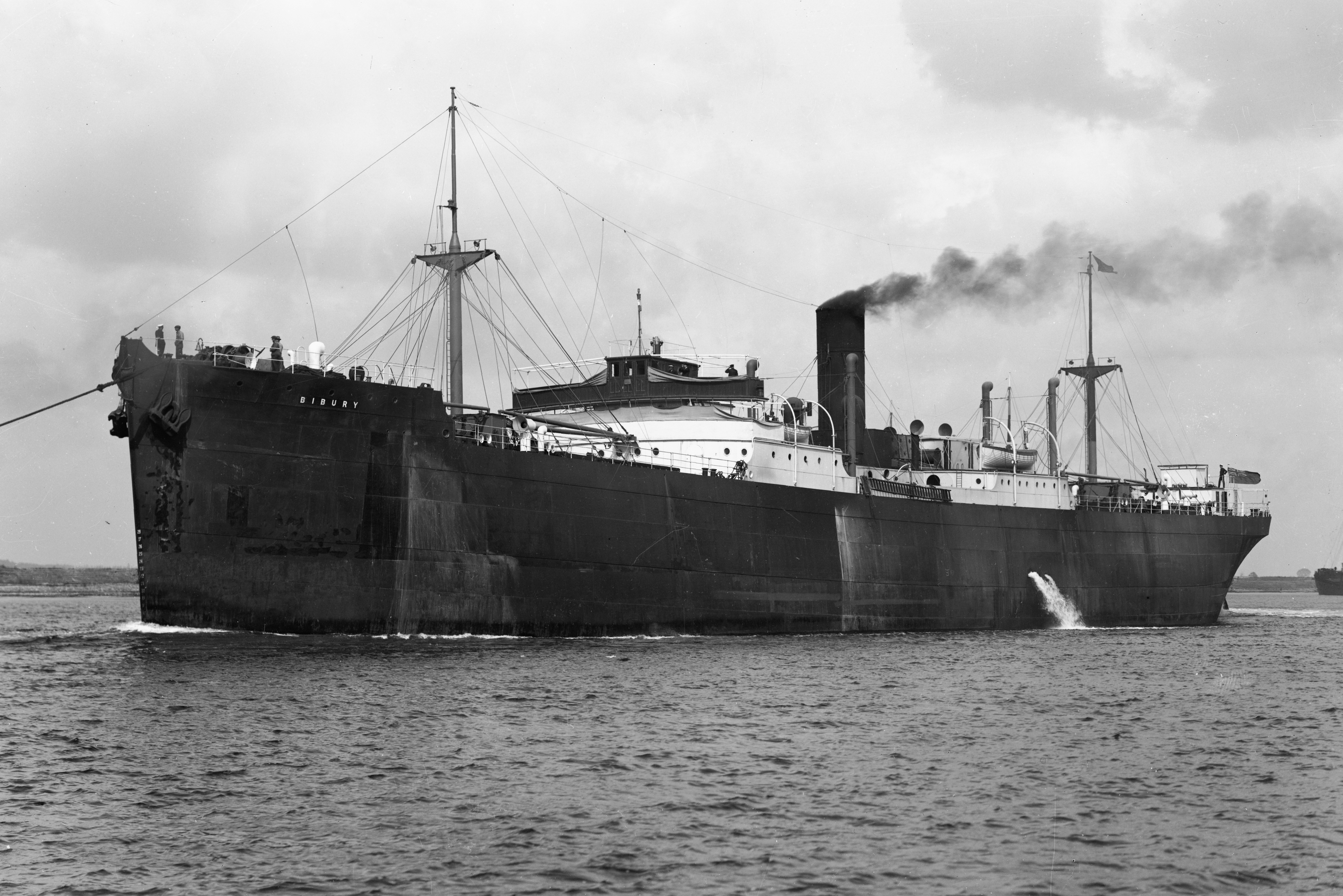
Cargo ship Bibury, built in 1929

Robert Duncan and Company was a shipyard in the town of Port Glasgow on the Clyde in Scotland.

== History ==
The shipbuilder Robert Duncan had spent his previous working life in shipbuilding before he acquired in 1830 at the age of 35 years, the shipyard East Yard in the town of Port Glasgow previously owned by John Wood and Company. Having founded his own shipyard he began with the construction of iron ships. Until the 1860s, he continued to build only sailing ships for worldwide buyers until in 1866 Duncan launched the first screw steamer. A decade later steel began to replace iron as the main shipbuilding material. Duncan's three sons joined the company in 1883; Robert Duncan died in 1889 and the sons continued to run the yard.

Sailing ships were created in addition to large steamboats and smaller trampers . Noteworthy is the twin-screw steamship Flying Serpent, built in 1886 at Duncan, later provided with a diesel engine, 1928 initially converted to a trawler, from 1951 then used as a cargo ship and only deleted in 1998 from the register.

A whole series of trampships was built for the Greek shipowner Alexandros Michalinos during this time. The last sailing ship was delivered in 1900 to the Chilean shipping company AP Lorentzen Alta.

During the First World War the company produced freight ships and tramp steamers from Duncan's slipways. In addition, a standard type "C" freighter and three standard type "Z" tankers were built. Early in the war, in 1915, the shipbuilding company Lithgows (then known as Roberts & Co), took over the Duncan shipyard, but the yard continued to operate under its old trade name.

In the immediate post-war period there was a lack of demand, however the shipyard managed to build over 26 liner freighters and trampers and 13 tankers between 1920 and 1931, when the Great Depression forced the shipyard to close.

In total approximately 400 ships were built at the shipyard under the name Duncan. When the East Yard shipyard reopened in April 1937, it operated as a wholly owned subsidiary of Lithgows.
