= Portuguese gunboat Limpopo =

Gunboat

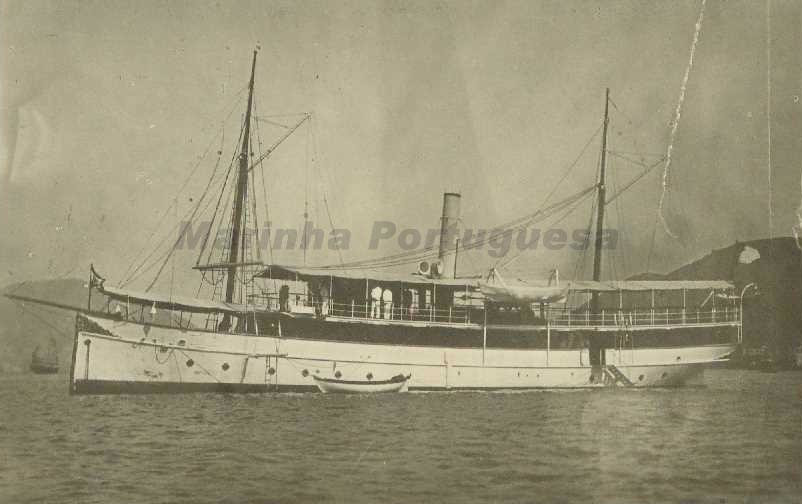

History

Portugal
- Name: Limpopo
- Commissioned: 1890
- Decommissioned: 1943

General characteristics
- Type: Gunboat

Limpopo was a gunboat built for the Portuguese Navy in England in 1890. It was in service in Ajuda, São Tomé, and Cape Verde. In 1904, the boat was used in a battle against a Russian squadron in Tigres Bay. For a time it was commanded by famous Portuguese geographer Carlos Viegas Gago Coutinho.

It was taken out of active use in 1939 and decommissioned in 1943.
