= Phlégéton-class ironclad gunboat =

Type of ironclad vessel

Class overview
- Name: Achéron class
- Builders: Arsenal de Cherbourg
- Operators: French Navy
- Preceded by: Achéron class
- Succeeded by: None
- Built: 1885–1893
- In service: 1892–1919
- Completed: 2
- Scrapped: 2

General characteristics
- Type: Ironclad gunboat
- Displacement: 1,796 t (1,768 long tons)
- Length: 59.2 m (194 ft 3 in) (o/a)
- Beam: 12.3 m (40 ft 4 in)
- Draft: 3.8 m (12 ft 6 in)
- Installed power: 4 locomotive boilers; 1,700 ihp (1,300 kW)
- Propulsion: 2 propellers, 2 compound-expansion steam engines
- Speed: 13 knots (24 km/h; 15 mph)
- Range: 1,800 nmi (3,300 km; 2,100 mi) at 8 knots (15 km/h; 9.2 mph)
- Complement: 99
- Armament: 1 × single 274 mm (10.8 in) gun; 1 × single 138.6 mm (5.5 in) gun; 2 × single 47 mm (1.9 in) guns; 3 × 5-barrel 37 mm (1.5 in) revolver cannon; 2 × single 37 mm (1.5 in) guns
- Armor: Waterline belt: 200 mm (7.9 in); Turret: 200 mm (7.9 in); Barbette: 200 mm (7.9 in); Deck (ship): 20 mm (0.8 in)

The Phlégéton-class consisted of two ironclad gunboats built for the French Navy in the 1880s. They spent the bulk of their careers in reserve.

== Ships ==
Construction data
Name	Laid down	Launched	Completed	Fate
Phlégéton	March 1885	20 December 1890	October 1892	Sunk as a target, 1917
Styx	September 1889	22 August 1891	March 1893	Sold for scrap, 19 December 1919

== Bibliography ==
- Campbell, N. J. M. (1979). "France". In Chesneau, Roger & Kolesnik, Eugene M. (eds.). Conway's All the World's Fighting Ships 1860–1905. Greenwich: Conway Maritime Press. pp. 283–333. ISBN 0-8317-0302-4.
- Roberts, Stephen S. (2021). French Warships in the Age of Steam 1859–1914: Design, Construction, Careers and Fates. Barnsley, UK: Seaforth Publishing. ISBN 978-1-5267-4533-0.
- Roche, Jean-Michel (2005). Dictionnaire des bâtiments de la flotte de guerre française de Colbert à nos jours [Dictionary of French Warships from Colbert to Today] (in French). Vol. Tome I: 1671–1870. Toulon: Roche. ISBN 978-2-9525917-0-6. OCLC 165892922.
