= List of shipwrecks in 1797 =

The list of shipwrecks in 1797 includes ships sunk, foundered, wrecked, grounded or otherwise lost during 1797.

table of contents
1797
Jan	Feb	Mar	Apr
May	Jun	Jul	Aug
Sep	Oct	Nov	Dec
Unknown date

== January ==
=== 2 January ===
List of shipwrecks: 2 January 1797
Ship	State	Description
Surveillante	French Navy	War of the First Coalition, Expédition d'Irlande: The Iphigénie-class frigate was scuttled in Bantry Bay. Her crew were rescued.

=== 8 January ===
List of shipwrecks: 8 January 1797
Ship	State	Description
Suffren	Great Britain	War of the First Coalition, Expédition d'Irlande: The transport ship was captured by HMS Jason (Royal Navy) and was scuttled.

=== 11 January ===
List of shipwrecks: 11 January 1797
Ship	State	Description
Burton	Great Britain	The collier ran aground on Scroby Sands, Norfolk. She was consequently beached at Great Yarmouth, Norfolk.
Ganges	British East India Company	The brig caught fire in Saugar Roads in the Ganges Delta and exploded with the loss of eight lives after the fllames spread to her gunpowder magazine. The vessel Laurel (Flag unknown) rescued her 99 survivors. Some sources place this incident on 11 January 1799.
Hazleton	Great Britain	The collier was wrecked on Scroby Sands.
Prosperous	Great Britain	The collier ran aground on Scroby Sands. She was consequently beached at Great Yarmouth.

=== 14 January ===
List of shipwrecks: 14 January 1797
Ship	State	Description
HMS Amazon	(Kingdom of Great Britain) Royal Navy	Droits de l'Homme (centre) War of the First Coalition, Action of 13 January 1797: The frigate ran aground at Audierne, Finistère, France and was wrecked with the loss of six of her crew.
Berwick	French Navy	War of the First Coalition: The Elizabeth-class ship of the line ran aground on the Merchants Rocks, in Macrihanish Bay. Her 650 crew were rescued and taken as prisoners of war.
xxxx	Great Britain	The .
Droits de l'Homme	French Navy	War of the First Coalition, Action of 13 January 1797: The Téméraire-class ship of the line was driven ashore and wrecked at Plozévet, Finisterre with the loss of between 250 and 390 lives.
Jamaica	Great Britain	The transport ship foundered in the Atlantic Ocean (44°N 14°W). Her crew were rescued. She was on a voyage from Saint Kitts to London.

=== 18 January ===
List of shipwrecks: 18 January 1797
Ship	State	Description
Indian Chief	United States	The ship was destroyed by fire at Falmouth, Cornwall.

=== 21 January ===
List of shipwrecks: 21 January 1797
Ship	State	Description
Thomas and Alice	Great Britain	The ship was run down and sunk in the River Thames at Blackwall, Middlesex by Hindostan ( British East India Company). Thomas and Alice was on a voyage from Blyth, Northumberland to London.

=== Unknown date ===
List of shipwrecks: Unknown date in January 1797
Ship	State	Description
Active	Great Britain	The ship was driven ashore and wrecked in the River Thames at Woolwich, Kent. She was on a voyage from London to Liverpool, Lancashire.
Agnes	Great Britain	The ship was lost near Whitehaven, Cumberland.
Albion	Great Britain	The ship was wrecked in the Isles of Scilly whilst on a voyage from Ipswich, Suffolk to Bristol, Gloucestershire.
Amphion	Sweden	The ship was driven ashore near Worthing, Sussex, Great Britain. She was on a voyage from St. Ubes, Portugal to Gothenburg.
Ann	Great Britain	The ship was lost at Gibraltar. She was on a voyage from Gibraltar to Lisbon, Portugal.
Bailies	Great Britain	The ship was lost on the Horle, off Portsmouth, Hampshire. Her crew were rescued. She was on a voyage from London to the West Indies.
Betsey	Great Britain	War of the First Coalition: The ship was sunk by cannon fire from a privateer whilst on a voyage from Bristol to Faro, Portugal.
Buona Elina	Republic of Venice	The ship was wrecked on the south coast of the Isle of Wight, Great Britain. She was on a voyage from Venice to London.
Betsey	Great Britain	The ship was lost on the coast of Ireland with the loss of three lives. She was on a voyage from Lisbon to Liverpool.
Calypso	Great Britain	War of the First Coalition: The ship was captured by La Tortue (French Navy), set afire and sunk. She was on a voyage from Lisbon to London.
Charlestown	United States	The ship foundered in the Atlantic Ocean whilst on a voyage from Maryland to Rotterdam, South Holland, Batavian Republic. Her crew were rescued.
Concordia	Sweden	The ship was lost on the coast of Jutland. She was on a voyage from London to Gothenburg.
Conjecturea	Portugal	The ship was lost near Calais, France. She was on a voyage from Riga, Russia to Lisbon.
Dorothea Catherina	Bremen	The ship was wrecked on Heligoland whilst on a voyage from Baltimore, Maryland, United States to Bremen.
Downes	Great Britain	The ship was lost near Lisbon with the loss of three of her crew.
Draper	Great Britain	War of the First Coalition: The ship was captured and sunk by the French. She was on a voyage from Porto, Portugal to Dublin, Ireland.
Dublin	Ireland	The ship was driven ashore at Carlingford, County Louth. She was on a voyage from Liverpool to Dublin.
Elizabeth	Great Britain	The ship was wrecked on the Irish coast. She was on a voyage from Cádiz, Spain to Guernsey, Channel Islands.
Elizabeth	Great Britain	The ship foundered in the Atlantic Ocean. She was on a voyage from Jamaica to Virginia, United States.
Fame	United States	The ship was wrecked on the coast of Holland. She was on a voyage from Baltimore, Maryland to Rotterdam, South Holland, Batavian Republic.
Friends	Great Britain	The ship was wrecked on the Welsh coast with the loss of four of her crew. She was on a voyage from Liverpool to Bristol.
Friends	Great Britain	The ship was lost in Dundrum Bay. She was on a voyage from Liverpool to Campbeltown, Argyllshire.
Hope	Ireland	War of the First Coalition: The ship was captured by the French and was subsequently lost.
Hope	Great Britain	War of the First Coalition: The ship was captured and sunk by a French squadron.
Industria	Hamburg	The ship was lost off Porto.
Jane	Great Britain	The ship was lost on the Needing. She was on a voyage from Riga to London.
Jenny	Great Britain	The ship was wrecked on Lundy Island, Devon with the loss of all but one of her crew. She was on a voyage from Africa to Bristol.
Juno	Great Britain	The transport ship was wrecked in the Isles of Scilly.
Lord John Campbell	Great Britain	The ship was lost with all hands. She was on a voyage from the "Highlands" to Liverpool.
Maria Christina	Stettin	The galiot was driven ashore at the Old Head of Kinsale, County Cork, Ireland in late January. She was on a voyage from Porto to Liverpool.
Mary	Great Britain	War of the First Coalition: The sloop was captured by the privateer La Bonne Citoyenne (France). She was subsequently wrecked at Guernsey, Channel Islands.
Mercey	Great Britain	The ship was driven ashore at Newhaven, Sussex. She was on a voyage from Cork, Ireland to London.
Mercury	Great Britain	The ship was lost in the Isles of Scilly. She was on a voyage from the Isles of Scilly to London.
Mermaid	Great Britain	The ship was lost in Dundrum Bay. She was on a voyage from Liverpool to Africa.
Minerva	Great Britain	The ship was wrecked at Figueira da Foz, Portugal. She was on a voyage from Newfoundland, British America to Portugal.
Molly and Nancy	Great Britain	The ship was lost on the Scottish coast. She was on a voyage from Liverpool to the Isle of Mull.
Nancy	Great Britain	The ship foundered in the Celtic Sea off St. Ives, Cornwall. Her crew were rescued.
Neptune	Great Britain	The ship was driven ashore at Dragør, Denmark. She was on a voyage from Königsburg, Prussia to London.
Olive Branch	Great Britain	The ship capsized in the North Sea with the loss of all hands. She was on a voyage from the Baltic to a Scottish port. Olive Branch was towed in to Peterhead, Aberdeenshire in a capsized condition.
Peter Munck	Danzig	The ship foundered in the Baltic Sea. She was on a voyage from Copenhagen, Denmark to Danzig.
Phillis	Great Britain	The ship was driven ashore near Carlingford. She was on a voyage from London to Liverpool.
Pomona	Great Britain	The ship was driven ashore at Newhaven. She was on a voyage from Cork to London
Providence	Great Britain	The ship was lost near St. David's, Pembrokeshire. She was on a voyage from Liverpool to Bristol.
Ranger	Great Britain	The ship was driven ashore at Whitby, Yorkshire.
Resolution	Great Britain	War of the First Coalition: The ship was captured off "Cape Clare" and was subsequently lost.
Sarah	Great Britain	The ship was wrecked on Bornholm, Denmark.
Sincerity	Great Britain	The sloop was lost at Plymouth, Devon. She was on a voyage from Tenby, Pembrokeshire to Dartmouth, Devon.
Sisters	Great Britain	War of the First Coalition: The ship was captured of the Isles of Scilly by the French and was burnt. She was on a voyage from Falmouth to Lisbon.
Sovereign	Great Britain	The ship foundered in the Grand Banks of Newfoundland whilst on a voyage from Quebec to London. Her crew were rescued by Hebe (United States).
Speedy Packet	Great Britain	The ship foundered in the English Channel whilst on a voyager from Jersey, Channel Islands to Southampton, Hampshire.
St. John	Great Britain	The ship was lost at Domesnes, Norway.
Surveillante	French Navy	Expédition d'Irlande: The Iphigénie-class frigate was scuttled in Bantry Bay.
Syrene	Stettin	The ship was wrecked on the French coast. She was on a voyage from Stettin to Bordeaux, Gironde, France.
Thames	Great Britain	The ship was driven ashore at Newhaven. She was on a voyage from Cork to London.
Thetis	Great Britain	The ship foundered in the North Sea off Sunderland, County Durham whilst on a voyage from Memel, Prussia to London.
Three Friends	Great Britain	War of the First Coalition: The ship was captured by the French and was scuttled. She was on a voyage from Liverpool to Cork.
Two Friends	Great Britain	The ship was driven ashore near Brighton, Sussex. She was on a voyage from the Strait of Gibraltar to London.
Unity	Great Britain	The ship was driven ashore near Carlingford. She was on a voyage from London to Liverpool.
Volunteer	Great Britain	The ship was lost on the coast of Ireland. She was on a voyage from Cork to Falmouth.
Westmoreland Packet	Great Britain	The ship was driven ashore and severely damaged at Falmouth.
William	Great Britain	The ship was driven ashore on the Irish coast and was plundered by the local inhabitants. She was on a voyage from Chester, Cheshire to London.
William and James	Great Britain	The ship capsized in the North Sea with the loss of all but two of her crew. She was on a voyage from a Baltic port to Liverpool.
Wye	Great Britain	The brig was wrecked on Lundy Island with the loss of all hands. She was on a voyage from Chepstow, Monmouthshire to Plymouth.
Unnamed	Sweden	The ship was abandoned by her crew. She was subsequently towed in to St Brides Bay.

== February ==
=== 1 February ===
List of shipwrecks: 1 February 1797
Ship	State	Description
Ocean	British East India Company	The East Indiaman ran aground on a reef off Kalatea (7°09′S 121°00′E). She was scuttled on 5 February with the loss of two of her crew.

=== 3 February ===
List of shipwrecks: 3 February 1797
Ship	State	Description
Greyhound	Great Britain	The ship was wrecked at Faial Island, Azores with some loss of life.

=== 7 February ===
List of shipwrecks: 7 February 1797
Ship	State	Description
Sydney Cove	(Kingdom of Great Britain) New South Wales	The ship was beached on Preservation Island, Van Diemen's Land. All on board survived.

=== 18 February ===
List of shipwrecks: 18 February 1797
Ship	State	Description
Arrogante	Spanish Navy	Spanish ships burning at Trinidad. War of the First Coalition, Invasion of Trinidad: The third rate ship of the line was burnt at Trinidad to prevent capture by the Royal Navy.
Gallardo	Spanish Navy	War of the First Coalition, Invasion of Trinidad: The third rate ship of the line was burnt at Trinidad to prevent capture by the Royal Navy.
Santa Cecilia	Spanish Navy	War of the First Coalition, Invasion of Trinidad: The fifth rate frigate was burnt at Trinidad to prevent capture by the Royal Navy.
San Vicente Ferrer	Spanish Navy	War of the First Coalition, Invasion of Trinidad: The third rate ship of the line was burnt at Trinidad to prevent capture by the Royal Navy.

=== 21 February ===
List of shipwrecks: 21 February 1797
Ship	State	Description
Souris	French Navy	War of the First Coalition: The gunboat ran aground at the mouth of the Isigny. She was captured by HMS Badger, HM Hired armed ship Champion, HM Hired armed ship Fly, and HMS Sandfly (all Royal Navy.

=== 23 February ===
List of shipwrecks: 23 February 1797
Ship	State	Description
Elizabeth	Ireland	The ship foundered in the Atlantic Ocean. She was on a voyage from New York, United States to Londonderry.

=== 25 February ===
List of shipwrecks: 25 February 1797
Ship	State	Description
Wyndham	Great Britain	The ship was wrecked on the Nash Sands, in the Bristol Channel with the loss of all but two of her crew. She was on a voyage from Neath, Glamorgan to Watchet, Somerset.

=== Unknown date ===
List of shipwrecks: Unknown date in February 1797
Ship	State	Description
Apphia	Great Britain	War of the First Coalition: The ship was captured and sunk off the coast of Ireland by the French. She was on a voyage from Porto, Portugal to Bristol, Gloucestershire.
Bueno Elenna	Great Britain	The ship was driven ashore on the Isle of Wight. She was on a voyage from Falmouth, Cornwall to London.
Chance	Great Britain	The ship was driven ashore on the coast of Lincolnshire. She was on a voyage from Hull to Leith, Lothian.
Charlotte	Flag unknown	The ship was lost whilst on a voyage from Cette, Hérault, France to Barcelona, Spain. Her crew were rescued.
Daniel	Great Britain	The ship was lost near Castlehaven, County Cork, Ireland. She was on a voyage from Barbados to Liverpool, Lancashire.
Elizabeth	Great Britain	The ship was driven ashore at Ramsgate, Kent. She was on a voyage from Cork, Ireland to Ramsgate and London.
Falmouth	Great Britain	War of the First Coalition: The ship was captured in the English Channel by the privateers Ferret and Unitie (both France). She was subsequently lost off Dunkirk, Nord, France Falmouth was on a voyage from Cork to London.
Iris	Great Britain	The ship ran aground on the Burbo Bank, in Liverpool Bay. She was on a voyage from London to Liverpool.
Julie	Denmark	The ship was lost on Texel, North Holland, Batavian Republic. She was on a voyage from Copenhagen to Saint Croix.
Maria Christiana	Portugal	The ship was lost near Kinsale, County Cork, Ireland. She was on a voyage from Lisbon to Liverpool.
Peggy	Great Britain	The ship was lost whilst on a voyage from London to Whitehaven, Cumberland.
Tristram	Great Britain	War of the First Coalition: The ship was captured by the French and was scuttled in Galway Bay. She was on a voyage from Newfoundland to Poole, Dorset.
William	Ireland	The ship was lost at Workington, Cumberland. She was on a voyage from Dublin to Jamaica. William later came ashore on the Galloway coast.

== March ==
=== 10 March ===
List of shipwrecks: 10 March 1797
Ship	State	Description
Printsessa Yelena (Принцесса Елена, 'Princess Elena')	Imperial Russian Navy	The transport ship was driven ashore and wrecked at Odesa. Her crew were rescued. She was on a voyage from Odesa to Sevastopol.

=== 20 March ===
List of shipwrecks: 20 March 1797
Ship	State	Description
Jason	Great Britain	The ship departed from Havana, Cuba for Hamburg. No further trace, presumed foundered with the loss of all hands.

=== 24 March ===
List of shipwrecks: 24 March 1797
Ship	State	Description
Betsey	Great Britain	The ship departed from the Isles of Scilly for Milford Haven, Pembrokeshire. No further trace; presumed foundered with the loss of all hands.

=== 28 March ===
List of shipwrecks: 28 March 1797
Ship	State	Description
Sally	United States	The snow was wrecked on "Georgie Island". Her crew were rescued by the whaler Young William (Great Britain).

=== Unknown date ===
List of shipwrecks: Unknown date in March 1797
Ship	State	Description
Belle Flore	Hamburg	The ship was driven ashore. She was on a voyage from London, Great Britain to Hamburg.
Betsey	Great Britain	The ship foundered in the Atlantic Ocean. Her crew were rescued by Parsey (Great Britain). Betsey was on a voyage from Wiscasset, Maine, United States to Liverpool, Lancashire.
Charlotte	Great Britain	The ship was driven ashore near Bangor. She was on a voyage from Pärnu, Russia to Liverpool.
Commerce	Great Britain	The ship was wrecked on the coast of Ireland whilst on a voyage from Liverpool to Limerick, Ireland.
Delia	Denmark	The ship was lost on the Anholt Reef. Her crew were rescued. She was on a voyage from Málaga, Spain to Copenhagen.
Grizzie	Ireland	The ship was driven ashore in Galway Bay. She was on a voyage from Limerick to London.
Jong Jacob	Batavian Republic	The ship was lost near Cherbourg, Seine-Inférieure, France. She was on a voyage from Rotterdam, South Holland to Guernsey, Channel Islands.
London Packet	Great Britain	The ship was holed by her anchor and sank at Dublin. She was on a voyage from Newry, County Down, Ireland to London. London Packet was later refloated.
Louisa Christina	Sweden	The ship was wrecked on the coast of Norway. She was on a voyage from Uddevalla to Cork, Ireland.
Margaretta Elizabeth	Hamburg	The ship ran aground on the Goodwin Sands, Kent, Great Britain and was abandoned by her crew. She was on a voyage from Altona, Hamburg to New York, United States. Margaretta Elizabeth was later refloated and taken in to Ramsgate, Kent.
Mary	Great Britain	The ship was driven ashore near Aberdeen. Her crew were rescued. She was on a voyage from Hull, Yorkshire to Philadelphia, Pennsylvania, United States.
Paisley	Great Britain	The ship was driven ashore near Boston, Lincolnshire. Her crew were rescued. She was on a voyage from Glasgow, Renfrewshire to London.
Queen of Naples	Great Britain	The ship foundered in Youghal Bay before 10 March. She was on a voyage from Liverpool to Lisbon, Portugal.
Success	Great Britain	The ship was driven ashore and wrecked near Castlemaine, County Kerry, Ireland. She was on a voyage from Limerick to London.
William Henry	Great Britain	The ship was wrecked on Long Island, County Cork, Ireland.

== April ==
=== 1 April ===
List of shipwrecks: 1 April 1797
Ship	State	Description
HMS Tartar	Royal Navy	The Lowestoffe-class frigate was wreceked off Saint-Domingue.

=== 14 April ===
List of shipwrecks: 14 April 1797
Ship	State	Description
Worcester	British East India Company	The East Indiaman ran aground in the River Thames at Blackwall, Middlesex. She was on a voyage from London to India.

=== 16 April ===
List of shipwrecks: 16 April 1797
Ship	State	Description
Harmonie	French Navy	War of the First Coalition, Battle of Jean-Rabel; Haitian Revolution: The Virginie-class frigate was deliberaterly run ashore and burnt near Jean-Rabel, Saint Domingue to avoid capture by HMS Thunderer and Valiant (both (Kingdom of Great Britain) Royal Navy).
Salvina	United States	The ship foundered in the Atlantic Ocean. She was on a voyage from Virginia to London, Great Britain.

=== 26 April ===
List of shipwrecks: 26 April 1797
Ship	State	Description
Santa Elena	Spanish Navy	War of the First Coalition, Action of 26 April 1797: The frigate was run aground and wrecked in Conil Bay having surrendered to HMS Emerald and HMS Irresistible (both (Kingdom of Great Britain) Royal Navy).

=== Unknown date ===
List of shipwrecks: Unknown date in April 1797
Ship	State	Description
HMS Albion	(Kingdom of Great Britain) Royal Navy	The Albion-class ship of the line ran aground in the Thames Estuary. She broke her back two days later and was a total loss.
Anna Maria	Sweden	The ship was lost in the Baltic Sea. She was on a voyage from Stockholm, Sweden to London Great Britain.
Cremorne	Great Britain	The ship was wrecked in the Sound of Beaumaris. She was on a voyage from Martinique to Liverpool, Lancashire.
Dunbar	Great Britain	War of the First Coalition: The ship was captured by the privateer Voltigeur (France) and was subsequently wrecked near Great Yarmouth, Norfolk.
Happy Return	Great Britain	The ship was wrecked at St. Agnes, Cornwall with the loss of all hands. She was on a voyage from Swansea, Glamorgan to Falmouth, Cornwall.
Nautilus	Great Britain	The ship sprang a leak and was abandoned by her crew. She was on a voyage from Cork, Ireland to Swansea, Glamorgan and Dartmouth, Devon. Nautilus was later towed in to Marazion, Cornwall.
Peggy	Great Britain	The ship was driven ashore on Møn, Denmark. She was on a voyage from Ely, Glamorgan to Memel, Prussia.
Prince Charles of Hesse	Great Britain	The ship was destroyed by fire off Cape Finisterre, Spain. She was on a voyage from Calabria to London.
Venus	Great Britain	The ship sank on the Nore.
William & Mary	Great Britain	The ship was driven ashore and wrecked at Memel.
Winskabet	Great Britain	The ship foundered in the Atlantic Ocean off Cape Spartel, Morocco whilst on a voyage from a Cornish port to Venice. Her crew were rescued.

== May ==
=== 16 May ===
List of shipwrecks: 16 May 1797
Ship	State	Description
HMS Providence	Royal Navy	The sloop-of-war was wrecked on a coral reef at the northwestern tip of Yabiji, a reef group in the Miyako Islands south of Okinawa. She filled from the bottom and sank after striking the reef.

=== 18 May ===
List of shipwrecks: 18 May 1797
Ship	State	Description
Hazard	Great Britain	War of the First Coalition: The ship was captured and sunk by the privateer Vengeance (France). She was on a voyage from Liverpool, Lancashire to Newfoundland, British America.

=== 19 May ===
List of shipwrecks: 19 May 1797
Ship	State	Description
Travancore	British East India Company	The East Indiaman was destroyed by fire at Bombay, India. She was on a voyage from Bombay to China.

=== Unknown date ===
List of shipwrecks: Unknown date in May 1797
Ship	State	Description
Conradi and Lovisa	Denmark	The ship was driven ashore at Stralsund, Swedish Pomerania. She was on a voyage from Copenhagen to Reval, Russia.
Diamond	Great Britain	The Artois-class frigate ran aground on the French coast. She was refloated and taken in to Portsmouth, Hampshire in a leaky condition.
Fame	Great Britain	War of the First Coalition: The ship was captured and burnt by a privateer. She was on a voyage from Lisbon, Portugal to London.
Favourite	Great Britain	War of the First Coalition: The ship was captured and burnt. She was on a voyage from Danzig to Newcastle upon Tyne, Northumberland.
Goodintent	Great Britain	War of the First Coalition: The ship was captured and burnt by the privateer Darete (France). She was on a voyage from Porto, Portugal to Newfoundland, British America.
Holderness	Great Britain	The ship was driven ashore near Danzig.
John and Mary	Great Britain	The ship was driven ashore and wrecked at Great Yarmouth, Norfolk. Her crew were rescued. She was on a voyage from St. Ubes, Portugal to a Baltic port.
Lady St. Clair	Great Britain	War of the First Coalition: The ship was captured and burnt off "Wingo" by a privateer. She was on a voyage from Dysart, Fife to Memel, Prussia.
St. George	Great Britain	The ship foundered off Cape Clear Island, County Cork, Kingdom of Ireland. She was on a voyage from Limerick to Cork.

== June ==
=== 1 June ===
List of shipwrecks: 1 June 1797
Ship	State	Description
Minerva	Great Britain	War of the First Coalition: The ship was captured and sunk off Skagen, Denmark by the privateer Courageaux (France). She was on a voyage from Newcastle upon Tyne, Northumberland to Ystad, Sweden.

=== Unknown date ===
List of shipwrecks: Unknown date in June 1797
Ship	State	Description
Arno	Great Britain	War of the First Coalition: The ship was driven ashore at Skagen, Denmark by a privateer. She was on a voyage from Great Yarmouth, Norfolk to Riga, Russia.
Cronberg	(Denmark) Danish Asiatic Company	The East Indiaman was driven ashore near Elsinore. She was on a voyage from Bengal, India to Copenhagen.
Friendship	Great Britain	War of the First Coalition: The ship was captured and sunk in the North Sea by a French privateer. She was on a voyage from Peterhead, Aberdeenshire to Hamburg.
Langton	Great Britain	War of the First Coalition: The ship was captured and burnt by a privateer.
HMS Pandora	(Kingdom of Great Britain) Royal Navy	The Mutin-class brig foundered in the North Sea with the loss of all hands.
Providence	Great Britain	War of the First Coalition: The ship was captured off Skagen, Denmark and was burnt. She was on a voyage from London to Narva, Russia.
HMS Resolution	(Kingdom of Great Britain) Royal Navy	After capturing the privateer Pichegru (France) on 3 June, the brig disappeared in the North Sea with the loss of all hands.
Sarah & Betty	Great Britain	The ship was driven ashore in the "Ross River". She was on a voyage from "Ross" to Liverpool, Lancashire.
Sophia	Great Britain	The ship foundered off Cape St. Vincent, Portugal. Her crew were rescued. She was on a voyage from Gibraltar to London.
Three Sisters	Great Britain	The ship was lost whilst on a voyage from Liverpool to Onega, Russia. Her crew were rescued.

== July ==
=== 16 July ===
List of shipwrecks: 16 July 1797
Ship	State	Description
Calliope	French Navy	War of the First Coalition: The corvette was driven ashore and wrecked on the Îles des Saintes in an engagement with HMS Anson and HMS Sylph (both (Kingdom of Great Britain) Royal Navy).
La Freedom	French Navy	War of the First Coalition: The ship was driven ashore on the Îles des Saintes in an engagement with HMS Anson and HMS Sylph (both (Kingdom of Great Britain) Royal Navy). She was burnt by the British.

=== 17 July ===
List of shipwrecks: 17 July 1797
Ship	State	Description
La Freedom	French Navy	War of the First Coalition: The ship was captured and burnt.
Le Calliope	French Navy	War of the First Coalition: The frigate was captured and sunk in Audierne Bay.
Le Henrie	France	War of the First Coalition: The sloop was captured and burnt in Audierne Bay. She was on a voyage from Nantes, Loire-Inférieure to Bordeaux, Gironde.
Unnamed	France	War of the First Coalition: The brig was captured and sunk in Audierne Bay. She was on a voyage from Nantes to Brest, Finistère.

=== 18 July ===
List of shipwrecks: 18 July 1797
Ship	State	Description
Auspicious	Great Britain	A fire aboard Auspicious at Calcutta almost destroyed her. She was preparing to sail to London and had about 400 tons of goods on board.

=== 22 July ===
List of shipwrecks: 22 July 1797
Ship	State	Description
La Fidelle	France	War of the First Coalition: The brig was captured and burnt in Audierne Bay. She was on a voyage from Nantes, Loire-Inférieure to Brest, Finistère.

=== 30 July ===
List of shipwrecks: 30 July 1797
Ship	State	Description
L'Anne	France	War of the First Coalition: The chasse-marée was captured and sunk off Île-Dieu. She was on a voyage from Bordeaux, Gironde to Noirmoutier, Vendée.

=== 31 July ===
List of shipwrecks: 31 July 1797
Ship	State	Description
HMS Artois	(Kingdom of Great Britain) Royal Navy	The 38-gun Artois-class frigate was wrecked with no loss of life on the north-west coast of Île de Ré while attempting to reconnoitre the harbour of La Rochelle.

=== Unknown date ===
List of shipwrecks: Unknown date in July 1797
Ship	State	Description
Dorothea	Stettin	The ship foundered in the Baltic Sea. She was on a voyage from Stettin to Riga, Russia.
Orange	Great Britain	War of the First Coalition: The ship was captured and sunk off Land's End, Cornwall by a French privateer. She was on a voyage from Dartmouth, Devon to Milford, Pembrokeshire.
Peggy	Great Britain	The ship foundered in the Baltic Sea.
Prince of Orange	Great Britain	The ship foundered whilst on a voyage from Liverpool, Lancashire to Guernsey, Channel Islands. Her crew were rescued.
Providence	Great Britain	The ship ran aground on the Fair Ness Rock, off Margate, Kent. She was on a voyage from Dublin, Ireland to London.
Thomas	Great Britain	The ship caught fire in the River Thames at the Tower of London and was scuttled. She was on a voyage from London to Waterford, Ireland.
Sv. Mikhail	Russian Empire	The vessel was wrecked on Umnak Island in the Catherine Archipelago.

== August ==
=== 2 August ===
List of shipwrecks: 2 August 1797
Ship	State	Description
Helen	Great Britain	The ship was wrecked at Barbados. She was on a voyage from London to Grenada.
Jackson	Great Britain	The ship was wrecked at Barbados. She was on a voyage from London to Jamaica.
Prince William Henry	Great Britain	The ship was wrecked at Barbados. She was on a voyage from London to Martinique.
Three Brothers	Great Britain	The transport ship was wrecked at Barbados.

=== 5 August ===
List of shipwrecks: 5 August 1797
Ship	State	Description
Konkordiya (Конкордия, 'Concordia')	Imperial Russian Navy	The transport ship was holed by her own anchor and sank in the Neva River fairway. Her crew were rescued. She was on a voyage from Saint Petersburg to Kronstadt. She was refloated, repaired and returned to service.

=== 10 August ===
List of shipwrecks: 10 August 1797
Ship	State	Description
Martha	British East India Company	The East Indiaman was lost in the Bengal River, India.

=== 11 August ===
List of shipwrecks: 29 August 1797
Ship	State	Description
Unnamed	French Navy	War of the First Coalition: The corvette was captured at Les Sables d'Olonne, Vendée. She was run ashore and wrecked.

=== 23 August ===
List of shipwrecks: 23 August 1797
Ship	State	Description
La Marie Anne	France	War of the First Coalition: The sloop was captured and sunk in Quiberon Bay. She was on a voyage from L'Orient, Morbihan to Bordeaux, Gironde.
La Pierre	France	War of the First Coalition: The sloop was captured and burnt off the Île Dieu. She was on a voyage from Rochefort, Charente-Inférierue to Brest, Finistère.

=== 29 August ===
List of shipwrecks: 29 August 1797
Ship	State	Description
Britannia	Great Britain	The ship foundered in the Atlantic Ocean. She was on a voyage from Trindade, Brazil to London.
La Petit Diable	French Navy	War of the First Coalition: The cutter was captured off Arcachon, Gironde. She was run ashore and wrecked.

=== 31 August ===
List of shipwrecks: 31 August 1797
Ship	State	Description
Peggy	Great Britain	The ship foundered in the Atlantic Ocean whilst on a voyage from Jamaica to a British port.

=== Unknown date ===
List of shipwrecks: Unknown date in August 1797
Ship	State	Description
Ann	Great Britain	The ship was driven ashore at Blakeney, Norfolk with the loss of a crew member. She was on a voyage from Saint Petersburg, Russia to London. She was refloated and taken in to Hull, Yorkshire for repairs.
HMS Artois	(Kingdom of Great Britain) Royal Navy	The Artois-class frigate struck a rock off the Île de Ré, Charente-Maritime, France and was wrecked. Her crew were rescued.
Clyde	Great Britain	War of the First Coalition: The ship was captured and sunk in the North Sea by a privateer.
Ceres	Great Britain	War of the First Coalition: The ship was captured and sunk in the North Sea by the privateer Courageaux (France). She was on a voyage from South Shields, County Durham to Copenhagen, Denmark.
Commerce	United States	The ship departed from Charleston, South Carolina for Bremen. No further trace, presumed foundered with the loss of all hands.
Courageaux	France	War of the First Coalition: The privateer exploded and sank in the North Sea during an engagement with Exeter (Great Britain). Only four of her 43 crew survived.
Eliza	Ireland	The ship was driven ashore and wrecked in the River Thames. She was on a voyage from Waterford to London.
Friendship	Great Britain	The ship was lost on Nixman's Ground, in the Baltic Sea. Her crew were rescued. She was on a voyage from Saint Petersburg, Russia to London.
Hannah	Sweden	The ship foundered in the Kattegat. She was on a voyage from Sweden to London.
Hilda	Great Britain	The ship was driven ashore on Lausholm, near Visby, Sweden. She was on a voyage from Saint Petersburg to Whitby, Yorkshire. She was refloated and taken in to "Sleet" for repairs.
John	Great Britain	War of the First Coalition: The ship was captured and sunk in the North Sea by a privateer. She was on a voyage from Great Yarmouth, Norfolk to Newcastle upon Tyne, Northumberland.
Jubilee	Ireland	The ship was driven ashore and wrecked on the coast of Swedish Pomerania. She was on a voyage from Rügen, Swedish Pomerania to Dublin.
Pointer	Great Britain	The ship caught fire at Gothenburg, Sweden and was scuttled. She was on a voyage from Saint Petersburg to Liverpool, Lancashire.

== September ==
=== 1 September ===
List of shipwrecks: 1 September 1797
Ship	State	Description
Chasseur	France	War of the First Coalition: The privateer was sunk in the North Sea off the coast of Norway by HMS Brilliant ( (Kingdom of Great Britain) Royal Navy).
Le Sardine Fraiche	France	War of the First Coalition: The brig, which had been captured on 29 August, foundered. Her crew were rescued. At the time of her capture, she was on a voyage from Bayonne, Pyrénées-Atlantiques to Bordeaux, Gironde and Nantes, Loire-Inférieure.
L'Intrepid	France	War of the First Coalition: The privateer was sunk in the North Sea off the coast of Norway by HMS Brilliant ( (Kingdom of Great Britain) Royal Navy).
HMS Robust	Royal Navy	The Ramillies-class ship of the line ran aground at Portsmouth, Hampshire. She was refloated and docked for repairs.

=== 3 September ===
List of shipwrecks: 3 September 1797
Ship	State	Description
Hunter	Great Britain	The ship sprang a leak in the Atlantic Ocean and was abandoned by her crew, who were rescued by Bristol (Great Britain). Hunter was set afire. She was on a voyage from North Carolina, United States to Liverpool, Lancashire.

=== 6 September ===
List of shipwrecks: 6 September 1797
Ship	State	Description
Betsey	United States	The sloop was wrecked in the Currituck Inlet.

=== 11 September ===
List of shipwrecks: 11 September 1797
Ship	State	Description
Providence	Great Britain	The ship was driven ashore and wrecked at Lowestoft, Suffolk. Her crew were rescued.

=== 12 September ===
List of shipwrecks: 12 September 1797
Ship	State	Description
John	Great Britain	War of the First Coalition: The ship was captured by a privateer and burnt. She was on a voyage from Lisbon, Portugal to Newfoundland, British America.

=== 14 September ===
List of shipwrecks: 14 September 1797
Ship	State	Description
Brothers	Great Britain	The brig was wrecked 4 leagues (12 nautical miles (22 km)) east of Liverpool, Nova Scotia, British America.

=== 15 September ===
List of shipwrecks: 15 September 1797
Ship	State	Description
La Republicaine	France	War of the First Coalition: The brig, which had been captured on 29 August, foundered. Her crew were rescued. At the time of her capture, she was on a voyage from Bayonne, Pyrénées-Atlantiques to Bordeaux, Gironde and Nantes, Loire-Inférieure.

=== Unknown date ===
List of shipwrecks: Unknown date in September 1797
Ship	State	Description
Ann	Great Britain	The ship foundered in the Dogger Bank. Her crew were rescued. She was on a voyage from Saint Petersburg, Russia to London.
Betsey	Great Britain	The ship was driven ashore at Helsingborg, Sweden. She was on a voyage from London to Saint Petersburg.
Carl Pieter	Sweden	The ship was driven ashore at Eastbourne, Sussex, Great Britain whilst on a voyage from Stockholm to Waterford, Ireland.
Cupid	Great Britain	The ship ran aground on the Gunfleet Sand, in the North Sea off the coast of Essex. She was on a voyage from Saint Petersburg to London.
Diana	Ireland	The ship sank in Dublin Bay. She was on a voyage from Antigua to Dublin.
Eliza	Hamburg	The ship departed from Hamburg for Africa and Surinam. No further trace, presumed foundered with the loss of all hands.
Fanny	Great Britain	The ship was lost near Penzance, Cornwall.
Glückleickeweiderkurf	Hamburg	The ship was driven ashore on the coast of Jutland. She was on a voyage from Hamburg to London.
Lethe	Great Britain	The ship was wrecked in the Isles of Scilly.
Providence	Great Britain	The ship foundered. She was on a voyage from Saint Petersburg to London.
Sophia Magdalena	Sweden	The ship was driven ashore and wrecked near Chichester, Sussex, Great Britain. She was on a voyage from Gothenburg to Lisbon, Portugal.
Triumph	Great Britain	The ship was wrecked at Newton, Gloucestershire whilst on a voyage from Waterford to Bristol, Gloucestershire.
Weetwood	Great Britain	The ship was driven ashore on Hogland, Russia. She was on a voyage from Saint Petersburg to London.
Xenophen	Great Britain	The ship was driven ashore near "Hornbeck".

== October ==
=== 11 October ===
List of shipwrecks: 11 October 1797
Ship	State	Description
Royal Charlotte	Great Britain	The East Indiaman was destroyed by an explosion in the Bengal River at Calpee, India with the loss of all on board. A bolt of lightning had hit her mast, travelled down it, and exploded her magazine.

=== 15 October ===
List of shipwrecks: 15 October 1797
Ship	State	Description
Delft	Great Britain	War of the First Coalition, Battle of Camperdown: The fourth rate ship-of-the-line foundered 0.5 nautical miles (930 m) off Great Yarmouth, Norfolk, Great Britain, following damage sustained in battle. One of the 120 people on board was lost.

=== 17 October ===
List of shipwrecks: 19 October 1797
Ship	State	Description
Orakabeza	Great Britain	War of the First Coalition:The ship was illegally captured and burned in the harbor at Charleston, South Carolina by a French privateer, possibly after running aground.

=== 19 October ===
List of shipwrecks: 19 October 1797
Ship	State	Description
David	Great Britain	The ship was driven ashore and wrecked near Liverpool, Lancashire with the loss of her captain. She was on a voyage from Liverpool to the West Indies.

=== 20 October ===
List of shipwrecks: 20 October 1797
Ship	State	Description
Beginning	Great Britain	The ship was driven ashore and wrecked at Leith, Lothian.
Eliza	Great Britain	The ship was driven ashore at Leith. She was on a voyage from Saint Petersburg, Russia to London. Eliza was later refloated and taken in to Leith for repairs.

=== 28 October ===
List of shipwrecks: 28 October 1797
Ship	State	Description
Grenville Bay	Great Britain	War of the First Coalition: The ship was captured by a French privateer. She was subsequently abandoned. Her crew were rescued by Ranger. Grenville Bay was on a voyage from Jamaica to London.
Nepobedimaya (Непобедимая, 'Invincible')	Imperial Russian Navy	The floating battery caught fire and exploded at Kronstadt.

=== Unknown date ===
List of shipwrecks: Unknown date in October 1797
Ship	State	Description
Ann	Great Britain	The ship was driven ashore and wrecked near Berwick upon Tweed, Northumberland. She was on a voyage from Glasgow, Renfrewshire to Hamburg.
Barbara	Great Britain	The ship was driven ashore on the coast of Cheshire. She was on a voyage from Liverpool, Lancashire to Martinique.
Carl Peter	Sweden	The ship was driven ashore at Eastbourne, Sussex, Great Britain. She was on a voyage from Stockholm to Waterford, Ireland.
Carolina	United States	The brig foundered in the Dogger Bank. Her crew were rescued. She was on a voyage from Hamburg to Sunderland, County Durham, Great Britain.
Carolina Wilhelmina	Stettin	The ship was lost near "Porttith", Cornwall, Great Britain with the loss of two of her crew. She was on a voyage from Liverpool to Stettin.
Dublin Packet	Great Britain	The ship was lost near Liverpool. She was on a voyage from Liverpool to New York, United States.
Eendraght	Danzig	The ship was lost on the Kentish Knock. Her crew were rescued. She was on a voyage from Danzig to Nantes, Loire-Inférieure, France.
Eliza	Great Britain	The ship was driven ashore near Liverpool, Lancashire. She was on a voyage from Liverpool to Jamaica.
Elizabeth	Bremen	The ship was driven ashore and wrecked near the Old Head of Kinsale, County Cork, Ireland. She was on a voyage from Bremen to Cork, Ireland.
Endeavour	Great Britain	The ship departed from Newfoundland, British America for an English port. No further trace, presumed foundered in the Atlantic Ocean with the loss of all hands.
Fox	Great Britain	The ship was driven ashore at Limerick, Ireland. She was on a voyage from Limerick to Liverpool.
Friede	(Sweden) Swedish Pomerania	The ship was driven ashore near Amrum, Duchy of Holstein. She was on a voyage from Wolgast to London.
Friendship	British East India Company	The East Indiaman was driven ashore at Rye Harbour, Sussex. She was on a voyage from Bengal, India to London.
George	Great Britain	The ship foundered in the Irish Sea. She was on a voyage from Liverpool to Dublin, Ireland.
Hibernia	Ireland	The ship was driven ashore and wrecked near Liverpool. She was on a voyage from Liverpool to Dublin.
John	Great Britain	The ship was driven ashore at Caernarfon. She was on a voyage from Liverpool to Dublin.
Liddle	Great Britain	The ship was lost whilst on a voyage from Danzig to London.
London	Great Britain	The ship was driven ashore near Sheerness, Kent. She was on a voyage from Quebec City, Lower Canada, British America to London.
Maria	Great Britain	The ship was driven ashore near Sheerness. She was on a voyage from London to Saint Kitts.
Mersey	Great Britain	The ship was driven ashore and wrecked near Beaumaris, Anglesey. She was on a voyage from Liverpool to Africa.
Monnikendam	United Netherlands Navy	The frigate was beached at Westkapelle, Zeeland and was wrecked.
Peggy	Great Britain	The ship was driven ashore at Tönning, Duchy of Holstein. She was on a voyage from Riga, Russia to Montrose, Forfarshire.
Trial	Great Britain	The ship was lost whilst on a voyage from Wisbech, Cambridgeshire to London.
William and Mary	Great Britain	The ship was wrecked at Padstow, Cornwall. She was on a voyage from Bristol, Gloucestershire to Dartmouth and Exeter, Devon.
Unnamed	Flag unknown	The ship was driven ashore near Liverpool. She was on a voyage from Danzig to Liverpool.
Unnamed	Great Britain	The ship sank in the English Channel off Selsey Bill, Sussex. She was on a voyage from Tenby, Pembrokeshire to London.

== November ==
=== 2 November ===
List of shipwrecks: 2 November 1797
Ship	State	Description
Audacious	Great Britain	The ship was wrecked at Madeira.
Myra	Ireland	The ship was wrecked at Madeira.
Nelly	Great Britain	The ship was wrecked at Madeira. She was on a voyage from Liverpool, Lancashire to Jamaica.

=== 3 November ===
List of shipwrecks: 3 November 1797
Ship	State	Description
North Carolina	United States	The ship was wrecked on "Albicoa Island", West Indies with the loss of five of her crew. She was on a voyage from the Cape Verde Islands, Portugal to Washington.

=== 6 November ===
List of shipwrecks: 6 November 1797
Ship	State	Description
Gofnung (Гофнунг, 'Hoffnung')	Imperial Russian Navy	The transport ship was driven ashore and wrecked on fi:Tiutinen Island at Kotka, Old Finland. Her crew were rescued.

=== 10 November ===
List of shipwrecks: 10 November 1797
Ship	State	Description
Martha	Great Britain	The East Indiaman was lost near the mouth of the Ganges.
Princess Amelia	Great Britain	The ship was wrecked on Sable Island, Nova Scotia, British America. Her crew were rescued.

=== 14 November ===
List of shipwrecks: 14 November 1797
Ship	State	Description
Mary	Great Britain	War of the First Coalition: The ship was captured whilst on a voyage from Newfoundland, British America to London. She was recaptured by HMS Jason ( (Kingdom of Great Britain) Royal Navy and burnt.

=== 16 November ===
List of shipwrecks: 16 November 1797
Ship	State	Description
HMS Tribune	(Kingdom of Great Britain) Royal Navy	The fifth rate frigate ran aground off Herring Cove, Nova Scotia, British America with the loss of over 240 lives. There were twelve survivors.

=== 18 November ===
List of shipwrecks: 18 November 1797
Ship	State	Description
Shepherdess	Great Britain	The ship was lost in Loch Eriboll. She was on a voyage from Saint Petersburg, Russia to Bristol, Lancashire.

=== 19 November ===
List of shipwrecks: 19 November 1797
Ship	State	Description
Speedwell	Great Britain	The ship foundered in the English Channel off Shoreham-by-Sea, Sussex. Her crew were rescued. She was on a voyage from London to Portsmouth, Hampshire.

=== Unknown date ===
List of shipwrecks: Unknown date in November 1797
Ship	State	Description
Aurora	Great Britain	The ship was driven ashore and severely damaged at Lisbon, Portugal. She was on a voyage from Lisbon to Bristol, Gloucestershire.
Dædalus	Great Britain	The ship was wrecked on the Scottish coast. She was on a voyage from Saint Petersburg, Russia to Chester, Cheshire.
Elizabeth	Great Britain	The ship was lost near Brighton, Sussex. She was on a voyage from Portsmouth, Hampshire to London.
Frederick	Sweden	The ship was wrecked on the Goodwin Sands, Kent, Great Britain. Her crew were rescued. She was on a voyage from Málaga, Spain to Stockholm.
Friends	Great Britain	The ship was driven ashore at Winterton-on-Sea, Norfolk.
George	Great Britain	The ship was driven ashore near Wallasey, Cheshire. She was on a voyage from Whitehaven, Cumberland to Liverpool, Lancashire.
Happy Meeting	Great Britain	The ship was lost near Scarborough, Yorkshire.
Hope	Great Britain	The lugger was run down and sunk in the English Channel off Beachy Head, Sussex by Belfast (Great Britain) with the loss of eleven of her crew.
Itrehoe	Portugal	The ship departed from Porto for Dublin, Ireland between 10 and 15 October. No further trace, presumed foundered in the Atlantic Ocean with the loss of all hands.
Jonge Sykau Fleet	Prussia	The ship departed from Königsberg for London. No further trace, presumed foundered with the loss of all hands.
Latona	Great Britain	The ship foundered in the North Sea off the Dudgeon Lightship (Great Britain).
Liberty	Great Britain	The ship was driven ashore at Harwich, Essex. She was on a voyage from Hamburg to London.
Liberty	Great Britain	The ship was driven ashore at Scarborough.
Mars	Great Britain	The ship was driven ashore near Memel, Prussia.
Mercury	Great Britain	The ship was driven ashore.
Partridge	Great Britain	The ship was driven ashore at Great Yarmouth, Norfolk.
Providence	Great Britain	The ship was driven ashore at Great Yarmouth.
Royal George	Great Britain	The ship foundered in the Bristol Channel. She was on a voyage from Bristol, Gloucestershire to Milford, Pembrokeshire.
Rufford	Great Britain	The ship was driven ashore near Riga, Russia.
Sisters	Great Britain	The ship foundered with the loss of all hands. She was on a voyage from St. Ives, Cornwall to Neath, Glamorgan.
Sisters	Great Britain	The ship was lost near Halifax, Nova Scotia, British America. She was on a voyage from London to Halifax.
Spring	Great Britain	The ship was driven ashore.
Verandering	Batavian Republic	The ship was lost on the Happisburgh Sands, in the North Sea off the coast of Norfolk. She was on a voyage from Newcastle upon Tyne, Northumberland, Great Britain to Dort, South Holland.
Worcester	Great Britain	The ship was driven ashore and wrecked near Sandown Castle, Kent. Her crew were rescued. She was on a voyage from London to Jamaica.

== December ==
=== 1 December ===
List of shipwrecks: 1 December 1797
Ship	State	Description
Chance	Great Britain	The ship was driven ashore in Carbonear Bay.
Eagle	Great Britain	The ship was driven ashore in Carbonear Bay.

=== 12 December ===
List of shipwrecks: 12 December 1797
Ship	State	Description
Christian & Betsey	Great Britain	The ship was wrecked on The Saints. Her crew were rescued. She was on a voyage from Gibraltar to London.

=== 15 December ===
List of shipwrecks: 15 December 1797
Ship	State	Description
Dolphin	France	War of the First Coalition: The privateer was captured in the Bay of Biscay by HMS Clyde ( (Kingdom of Great Britain) Royal Navy). She foundered the next day.

=== 17 December ===
List of shipwrecks: 17 December 1797
Ship	State	Description
Marquis of Worcester	Great Britain	The West Indiaman was wrecked on Chesil Beach, Dorset with the loss of all but one of her 24 crew. She was on a voyage from Saint Vincent to London.

=== 20 December ===
List of shipwrecks: 20 December 1797
Ship	State	Description
Haabet	Flag unknown	The ship departed from Porto, Portugal for Guernsey, Channel Islands. No further trace, presumed foundered with the loss of all hands.

=== 25 December ===
List of shipwrecks: 25 December 1797
Ship	State	Description
HMS Hamadryad	(Kingdom of Great Britain) Royal Navy	The fifth rate frigate was wrecked on the Barbary Coast.

=== Unknown date ===
List of shipwrecks: Unknown date in December 1797
Ship	State	Description
Agatha Phillipina	Danzig	The ship was lost whilst on a voyage from London, Great Britain to Danzig.
Alliance	Great Britain	The ship was driven ashore near Liverpool, Lancashire. She was on a voyage from New York to Liverpool.
Amphitrite	Great Britain	The ship was driven ashore near Wells-next-the-Sea, Norfolk. She was on a voyage from Stettin to London.
Bartholomew	Great Britain	The ship foundered in the English Channel off Seaford, Sussex with the loss of seven of her crew. She was on a voyage from Liverpool to Danzig.
Beaver	Great Britain	The ship ran aground on the Herd Sand, in the North Sea off the couast of County Durham.
Boston	Great Britain	The ship was lost at São Miguel Island, Azores.
Cadiz Packet	Great Britain	The brig was driven ashore in Stokes Bay and was wrecked. She was on a voyage from Hull, Yorkshire to Lisbon, Portugal. Cadiz Packet was later refloated.
Caresfort	Great Britain	The ship was wrecked at Dragør, Denmark. She was on a voyage from Danzig to Liverpool.
Dominus Tecum	Danzig	The ship was lost whilst on a voyage from London to Danzig.
Economy	Great Britain	The ship was lost on the Kentish Knock.
Eagle	Great Britain	The transport ship was wrecked at Ramsgate, Kent.
Egremont	Great Britain	The ship was wrecked on the Goodwin Sands, Kent. She was on a voyage from Newcastle upon Tyne, Northumberland to Littlehampton, Sussex.
Eliza	Great Britain	The ship was in collision with another vessel in the English Channel and was abandoned by her crew. She was on a voyage from London to Waterford, Ireland. Eliza was later towed in to Saint-Valery-sur-Somme, France.
Elizabeth	Great Britain	The ship was lost at Tralee, County Kerry, Ireland. She was on a voyage from Quebec City, Lower Canada, British America to Liverpool.
Enigheit	Sweden	The ship was driven ashore on Gotland. She was on a voyage from Stockholm to Liverpool.
Fanny	Great Britain	The ship was lost in the Gulf of Finland. She was on a voyage from Saint Petersburg, Russia to London.
Nossa Senhora da Graça (1787)	Portuguese Navy	The fourth rate frigate was driven ashore at Falmouth, Cornwall, Great Britain. She was subsequently refloated and returned to service.
Gateshead	Great Britain	The ship was lost whilst on a voyage from Gothenburg, Sweden to Newcastle upon Tyne.
George Brisset	Great Britain	The ship was lost whilst on a voyage from London to Liverpool with the loss of two of her crew.
Guardian	Great Britain	The ship was abandoned in the North Sea.
Happy	Great Britain	The ship foundered in the Irish Sea off Lytham St. Annes, Lancashire. She was on a voyage from Porto, Portugal to Liverpool, Lancashire.
Hope	Great Britain	The ship was lost near The Skerries, in the Irish Sea. She was on a voyage from Jamaica to Liverpool.
Infant Thomas	Great Britain	The ship was driven ashore near Memel, Prussia.
Jane	Great Britain	The ship was wrecked on the North and South Rock. She was on a voyage from Beaumaris, Anglesey to Belfast, County Down, Ireland.
Jane & Sarah	Great Britain	The ship was driven ashore in Stokes Bay. She was on a voyage from London to Lisbon. Jane & Sarah was later refloated.
Jason	Great Britain	The ship was lost on the Kentish Knock.
Jong Juffrow Anna Margaretta	Hamburg	The ship was driven ashore and wrecked on the coast of Ireland. She was on a voyage from London to Hamburg.
Juffrow Anna Alida	Batavian Republic	The ship was lost near "Weykopzee". She was on a voyage from Faro, Portugal to Rotterdam.
Lady Alleyne	Great Britain	The ship was driven ashore near Memel.
Liverpool Packet	Great Britain	The ship was driven ashore and wrecked near Beaumaris. She was on a voyage from Belfast to Liverpool.
Maria Charlotta	Stettin	The ship was wrecked on the Goodwin Sands. She was on a voyage from London to Stettin.
Mary	Great Britain	The ship ran aground on the Herd Sand.
Mary	Great Britain	The ship was wrecked near Milford Haven, Pembrokeshire with the loss of all but two of her crew. She was on a voyage from Martinique to London.
Nancy	Great Britain	The ship was driven ashore and wrecked near the mouth of the Humber. She was on a voyage from South Shields, County Durham to Portsmouth, Hampshire and Jamaica.
Neriod	Great Britain	The ship was lost near Land's End, Cornwall with the loss of all but four of her crew.
New Loyalty	Great Britain	The ship was lost in Dundrum Bay. She was on a voyage from Liverpool to Belfast.
Olive	Great Britain	The ship was driven ashore near "Wigen".
Planter	Great Britain	The ship ran aground on the Herd Sand.
Prince of Piedmont	Great Britain	The ship was driven ashore and wrecked near Chichester, Sussex. She was on a voyage from Barbados to London.
Rachael	Great Britain	The ship was lost at São Miguel Island, Azores.
Star	Great Britain	The ship was lost near Castlehaven, County Cork, Ireland. She was on a voyage from Porto to Liverpool.
Success	Batavian Republic	The brig was driven ashore in Stokes Bay and was wrecked. She was on a voyage from London to Porto, Portugal.
Success	Great Britain	The ship was lost whilst on a voyage from Liverpool to Bremen.
Swan	Great Britain	The ship was driven ashore near Aberystwyth, Cardiganshire. She was on a voyage from Waterford, Ireland to Liverpool.
Twee Gebroeders	Batavian Republic	The ship was driven ashore near Camperduin, North Holland. She was on a voyage from London to Rotterdam.
Two Brothers	Great Britain	The ship was driven ashore at Happisburgh, Norfolk.
Union	Great Britain	The ship sprang a leak and put into Whitby, Yorkshire, where she sank. Union was on a voyage from Teignmouth, Devon to Newcastle upon Tyne, Northumberland.
Zeelust	Hamburg	The ship was lost on the coast of Holland. She was on a voyage from London to Hamburg.

== Unknown date ==
List of shipwrecks: Unknown date in 1797
Ship	State	Description
Ann	Great Britain	War of the First Coalition: The ship was captured and sunk by the privateer La Eigle (France). She was on a voyage from Lisbon, Portugal to Gaspee, Lower Canada, British America.
Bridget	Great Britain	War of the First Coalition: The ship was captured by the French. She was subsequently wrecked on Martinique. Bridget was on a voyage from Africa to the West Indies.
Brothers	Great Britain	The ship was lost at Old Calabar.
Castle Semple	Great Britain	The ship was wrecked on Barbuda. She was on a voyage from Glasgow, Renfrewshire to the West Indies
Charlotte	British East India Company	The East Indiaman was lost near the mouth of the Ganges.
Cornwallis	Great Britain	War of the First Coalition: The ship was captured in the West Indies. She was sent in to Guadeloupe but was subsequently lost there. Cornwallis was on a voyage from Antigua to Liverpool, Lancashire.
Eliza	(Kingdom of Great Britain) Australia	The sloop-rigged longboat disappeared during a voyage from Preservation Island in Bass Strait to Sydney, New South Wales.
Elizabeth	Great Britain	The ship foundered in the Atlantic Ocean whilst on a voyage from Newfoundland to the Teignmouth, Devon.
Fame	Great Britain	The ship was lost at British Honduras.
Fanny	Great Britain	The transport ship collided with Briton (Great Britain) and foundered. All on board were rescued. She was on a voyage from Cork, Ireland to Halifax, Nova Scotia, British America.
Favourite	Ireland	War of the First Coalition: The ship was captured and sunk in the Atlantic Ocean (34°N 35°W) by Thétis (French Navy). She was on a voyage from Martinique to Cork.
General Marian	Great Britain	The ship was wrecked on the coast of Africa whilst on a voyage from Africa to the West Indies.
General Warren	Great Britain	The ship was lost.
Gibraltar	Great Britain	The ship was lost in Carbonear Bay.
Governor Williamson	Great Britain	The ship was lost on the African coast. She was on a voyage from Africa to the West Indies.
Hull Packet	Great Britain	The ship foundered before 12 December. She was on a voyage from North Carolina, United States to an English port.
Henry & Eliza	Great Britain	The ship sprang a leak and was beached at Port Antonio, Jamaica.
James	Great Britain	The ship was lost at Bonny, Nigeria.
Janet	United States	The ship foundered in the Atlantic Ocean. Her crew were rescued. She was on a voyage from Virginia to Jamaica.
John	United States	The ship was wrecked in the Delaware River. She was on a voyage from Hamburg to Philadelphia, Pennsylvania.
Kitty Cummings	Great Britain	War of the First Coalition: The ship was captured and burnt by Scipio (Batavian Navy). She was on a voyage from Demerara to Savannah, Georgia, United States.
Margarets	Great Britain	The ship was wrecked on Anticosti Island, Lower Canada. Her crew were rescued. She was on a voyage from Glasgow to Quebec City, Lower Canada.
Maria	Great Britain	The ship foundered in the Atlantic Ocean. Her crew were rescued. She was on a voyage from Dartmouth, Devon to Newfoundland.
Martin	Great Britain	The ship was driven ashore in the Hampton Roads, Virginia. She was on a voyage from Virginia to London.
Mary	Great Britain	The ship was wrecked on Saint Croix, Virgin Islands before 2 June.
Nelly	Great Britain	The letter of marque ship was lost on Heneaga. She was on a voyage from Jamaica to Nassau, Bahamas.
Nelly	Great Britain	The ship ran aground off Union Island. She was on a voyage from Demerara to Liverpool. Nelly was later refloated and taken in to Saint Vincent.
New Providence	Great Britain	War of the First Coalition: The ship was captured and subsequently lost at Saint-Domingue. She was on a voyage from Madeira to Saint-Domingue.
Orracabezza	Great Britain	War of the First Coalition: The ship was captured off Charleston, South Carolina, United States by a privateer and was burnt. She was on a voyage from Jamaica to London.
Polly	Great Britain	The ship was lost at Charleston, South Carolina. She was on a voyage from Havana, Cuba to Charleston.
Powhaton	United States	The ship was wrecked at Charleston, South Carolina. She was on a voyage from Liverpool to Charleston.
Prince Frederick	Great Britain	War of the First Coalition: The East Indiaman was captured by Insurgente (French Navy). She subsequently foundered but her crew were rescued. Prince Frederick was on a voyage from Bengal to London.
Prinsesse Louise Augusta	Danish Asiatic Company	The East Indiaman was wrecked.
Providence	Great Britain	War of the First Coalition: The ship was captured and subsequently run ashore at Saint-Domingue. She was on a voyage from London to Saint-Domingue.
Ranger	United States	The ship foundered in the Atlantic Ocean. Her crew were rescued by Roebuck Packet (Great Britain). Ranger was on a voyage from Bordeaux, Gironde, France to New York.
Recovery	Great Britain	The ship foundered in the Atlantic Ocean. Her crew were rescued. She was on a voyage from Newfoundland to Barbados.
Roebuck	Great Britain	War of the First Coalition: The ship was captured by the French off the coast of Africa and subsequently sank.
Salter	Great Britain	The ship was lost on the coast of British Honduras. She was on a voyage from London to British Honduras.
Schonhoven	Batavian Republic	The ship was lost in the Demarara River. She was on a voyage from Demerara to Grenada.
Simeon I Anna	Russian Empire	The vessel was lost during a voyage from Okhotsk in the Russian Empire to the Pribilof Islands in the Bering Sea.
Sisters	Great Britain	The ship foundered in the Bristol Channel off Worms Head, Glamorgan with the loss of all hands. She was on a voyage from St Ives, Cornwall to Neath, Glamorgan.
Sisters	Great Britain	The ship was driven ashore at Halifax.
Stag	Great Britain	The ship capsized at Halifax. She was on a voyage from Halifax to Jamaica.
Susannah	Great Britain	The ship was lost in the Saint Lawrence River. She was on a voyage from Quebec City to Halifax.
Three Friends	Great Britain	The ship was wrecked off Charleston, South Carolina whilst on a voyage from Charleston to London.
Three Sisters	Great Britain	The ship was driven ashore at Cape Cod, Massachusetts, United States. She was on a voyage from Liverpool to Boston, Massachusetts.
Triton	Great Britain	The schooner was lost in Carbonear Bay.
Venus	Great Britain	The whaler was losy in the Greenland Sea. Her crew were rescued.
Vrees & Hoop	Flag unknown	War of the First Coalition The ship was captured off Saint Lucia and was subsequently lost. She was on a voyage from Demerara to London.
William	United States	The schooner was wrecked on Heneaga.
York	Great Britain	The ship foundered off Jamaica whilst on a voyage from London to Jamaica.
Unnamed	French Navy	War of the First Coalition: The gunvessel, a brig, was sunk.
