= Ganges (Age of Sail merchant ship) =

During the Age of Sail many merchant ships were named Ganges, after the Ganges river in India.

- Ganges (1792 ship), made one voyage as an East Indiaman under contract to the British East India Company (EIC) in 1796, and one voyage transporting convicts to Australia in 1797. Last listed in 1802.
- Ganges (1798 ship), a French whaler launched at Philadelphia that after her capture became a British Southern Whale Fishery whaler
- Ganges (1799 ship) was launched at Newcastle-upon-Tyne. She made one voyage for the EIC in 1800–1801 bringing rice from Bengal for the British government. She then became a West Indiaman until the French navy captured her in 1805.
- Ganges (1806 ship) was launched at Calcutta. In 1807 or 1809 a French privateer captured her. The British Royal Navy recaptured her. She assumed British Registry in 1812, but had traded out of London since late 1810 or early 1811. By 1820 she was trading between London and Bengal. She was last listed in 1846.
- Ganges (1809 whaler), a Nantucket whaling ship operating in the Pacific in the nineteenth century. She was condemned in 1858.
- Ganges, of 606 tons burthen, was launched at Sulkea, Calcutta on 9 December 1813, and burned at Saugor on 3 September 1815.
- Ganges (clipper), 1854 clipper ship built in East Boston

== See also ==
- Ganges (East India Company ship)
