= Princess Amelia (ship) =

Several ships have been named Princess Amelia:

- Princess Amelia (1634 ship) was a Dutch merchant ship of 38 guns and 600 tons (bm) built in 1634 and wrecked off Swansea, Bristol Channel, in 1647. She served the Dutch West India Company and was one of the largest merchant ships of her day.
- Princess Amelia (1786 EIC ship) was launched in 1786 as an East Indiaman for the British East India Company (EIC). She made four voyages to India for the EIC and was lost in April 1798 to a fire off the Malabar Coast.
- Princess Amelia (1793 ship), of 172 tons (bm), was launched at Nova Scotia. She was wrecked on 9 November 1797 at Sable Island. Her crew and passengers were saved.
- Princess Amelia (1798 ship) was launched in 1798 at Liverpool. She made eight complete voyages as a slave ship in the triangular trade in enslaved people. After the end of British participation in the Trans-Atlantic slave trade, she became a merchantman. She was probably the Princess Amelia, from Liverpool, lost in 1810.
- Princess Amelia (1799 packet) was launched in 1799 and became a packet for the British Post Office Packet Service, sailing from Falmouth, Cornwall. She sailed to North America, the West Indies, Mediterranean, and Brazil. In 1800 a French privateer captured her, but she returned to the packet service later the same year. Joshua Barney, in the American privateer Rossie, captured her on 16 September 1812, at the start of the War of 1812. The United States Navy took her into service as HMS Georgia, but then renamed her USS Troup. She served as a guardship at Savannah until the Navy sold her in 1815.
- Princess Amelia (1801 ship) had been launched in France or the Netherlands in 1789, almost certainly under another name. She taken in prize in 1801. She made one unsuccessful voyage as a sealer in the British southern whale fishery. Thereafter she became a West Indiaman. She was reportedly broken up in 1807.
- Princess Amelia (1803 ship)'s origins are obscure. Between 1803 and 1804 she made one voyage from London as a slave ship in the triangular trade in enslaved people. She apparently was broken up in the West Indies after having delivered the slaves that she had brought from West Africa.
- Princess Amelia (1808 EIC ship) was launched in 1808 on the Thames East Indiaman. She made ten voyages for the British East India Company (EIC). The first six were as a "regular" ship; the next four represented single voyages contracted for by the EIC. On her fifth voyage Princess Amelia repatriated 1000 Chinese sailors stranded in London at the end of EIC vessels' arrival back in England. She was broken up in 1827.

== See also ==
- HMS Princess Amelia – One of three vessels by that name, plus one planned but never constructed.
