= Gunga =

Gunga may refer to:

- Ganges river in India
- Gunga, Bhopal, a village in India
- Gunga, a government office in ancient Japan
- Mohiddin Ghulam Gunga, Afghan wrestler • Gungas, Noun

== See also ==
- Ganga (disambiguation)
- Ganges (disambiguation)
- Gunga Din (disambiguation)
- Gunga Jumna, 1961 Indian film starring Dilip Kumar
