= Ganges (disambiguation) =

Ganges is a river in India.

Ganges may also refer to:

== Places ==
- Ganges, Hérault, a commune in the Hérault département in France
- Ganges, British Columbia, a town on Saltspring Island in the province of British Columbia in Canada
- Ganges, Ohio, a community in the United States
- Ganges Township, Michigan, in the United States
- Ganges Bank, a wholly submerged atoll structure in Indian Ocean southwest of the Chagos Archipelago
- Ganges Chasma, a deep canyon at the eastern end of the vast Valles Marineris system on Mars
- River Ganges is another name for Ping Yuen River in Hong Kong

== Ships ==
=== Nourse Line ships ===
- Ganges (1861), the first Nourse Line ship (1861–1881) to bear the name
- Ganges (1882), the second Nourse Line ship (1882–1917) to bear the name
- SS Ganges (1906), the third Nourse Line ship to be named Ganges

=== Warships ===
- Ganges-class ship of the line, a class of six 74-gun third rates in the British Royal Navy
- HMS Ganges, several ships of the British Royal Navy
- USS Ganges, a merchant vessel that the US converted to a man-of-war in the United States Navy during the Quasi-War with France

=== Other ships ===
- Ganges (East India Company ship), several ships
- Ganges (Age of Sail merchant ship), several ships
- SS Ganges (1947), a cargo ship in service 1954–1959
- USS Ganges (NCC-72454), a fictional vessel in the series Star Trek: Deep Space 9

== Other ==
- Ganges (comics)
- Ganges (TV series)

== See also ==
- Ganga (disambiguation)
- Gunga (disambiguation)
