= Ganges (East India Company ship) =

Many vessels named Ganges, after the Ganges river in India, have served the British East India Company (EIC) between the 17th and 19th centuries.

- Ganges (1676 ship), sloop of the Bengal Pilot Service
- Ganges (1703 ship), sloop of the Bengal Pilot Service
- Ganges (1778 EIC ship), an East Indiaman that made six voyages for the EIC and that was sold for breaking up in 1795 but before being broken up she served as a transport on Rear-Admiral Sir Hugh Cloberry Christian's expedition to the West Indies (1795-96).
- Ganges (1794 ship), brig launched at Bombay Dockyard in 1794 for the Bengal Pilot service and destroyed by fire in 1797 or 1799
- Ganges (1797 EIC ship), an East Indiaman that participated in the Battle of Pulo Aura and that was wrecked off the Cape on 29 May 1807
- Ganges (HEIC brig), an armed brig that also participated in the Battle of Pulo Aura

== See also ==
- Ganges (disambiguation) for other vessels
- Ganges (Age of Sail merchant ship)
- HMS Ganges for vessels named Ganges that served the British Royal Navy
