= Gangaram (disambiguation) =

Gangaram or Ganga Ram is a variant of the name Ganga.

Gangaram may also refer to:

== People ==
- Gangaram Thaware, Indian politician
- Gangaram Choudhary, Indian politician
- Ganga Ram, Indian architect and business
- Ganga Ram Chaudhary, Nepalese politician
- Ganga Ram Viakarni, an 18th-century mahant
- Ganga Ram Koli, Indian politician

== Places ==
- Gangaram, a village in Nagarkurnool district, Telangana
- Gangaram, a village in Mahabubabad district, Telangana
- Gangaram Chak, a village in Paschim Medinipur district, West Bengal
- Sir Ganga Ram Hospital, hospital in Delhi, India
- Sir Ganga Ram Hospital, hospital in Lahore, Pakistan

== Entertainment ==
=== Film ===
- Ram Ram Gangaram, 1977 Indian film
- Premi Gangaram, 1978 Indian film

=== Television ===
- Gangaram, Indian Bengali-language television series

=== Fictional character ===
- Gangaram, fictional character in 1990 Marathi film Dhadakebaaz

== Other uses ==
- Gangaram building collapse
