= Ganga (disambiguation) =

The Ganga, or Ganges, formerly also spelled Gunga, is one of the largest rivers in India.

Ganga may also refer to:

== Film ==
- Ganga (1960 film), a Bengali film directed by Rajen Tarafdar
- Ganga (1965 film), a Bhojpuri film directed by Kundan Kuma
- Ganga (1972 film), a Tamil film directed by M. Karnan
- Ganga (2006 film), a Bhojpuri film directed by Abhishek Chhadha
- Bodyguard (2012 film) (formerly Ganga), a 2012 Telugu film directed by Gopichand Malineni
- Ganga (2015 film), a Kannada film directed by Sai Prakash

== Other uses ==
- Ganga (goddess), the Hindu goddess that personifies the Ganges River
- Western Ganga dynasty (Gangas), an ancient southern Indian dynasty
- Eastern Ganga dynasty, a medieval Indian dynasty
- Gangaa, Indian television series
- Ganga (TV series), a 2017 Indian Tamil-language supernatural soap opera
- Ganga (music), a type of rural folk singing from Croatia, Bosnia and Herzegovina, and Montenegro
- Ganga (actor), Indian actor
- Daren Ganga (born 1979), a West Indies cricketer
- Ganga, a stage name for Danish electronic musician Christian Rønn
- Ganga Rani, Queen of Bhaktapur

== See also ==
- Ganges (disambiguation)
- Ganja (disambiguation)
- Gunga (disambiguation)
- Ganga Dynasty (disambiguation)
- Gangaram (disambiguation)
- Gunga Jumna, 1961 Indian film starring Dilip Kumar
