= Collapse of the Royal Plaza Hotel =

1993 disaster in Thailand

- Date: 13 August 1993
- Location: Mueang District, Nakhon Ratchasima Province, Thailand; 14.9739°N 102.0935°E
- Cause: Collapse after structural deformation due to creep
- Deaths: 137
- Injuries: 227

The collapse of the Royal Plaza Hotel occurred on 13 August 1993 in the city of Nakhon Ratchasima (Korat) in Thailand, killing 137 people and injuring 227. The 6-storey building's collapse into a pile of rubble took about 10 seconds; only the front elevator hall was left standing, which was built separately from the rest of the structure. Gradual deformation due to creep weakened all the ground floor support columns and when one failed the rest rapidly followed, resulting in an almost complete vertical collapse. Several people were rescued from the rubble and trapped victims called for help using mobile phones. Violation of safety regulations and an unprofessional approach on the part of the engineer were deemed to be the causes of the disaster. Police arrested the owner of the building and five others. Rescue operations continued for more than 20 days, until 3 September. It is one of the most fatal and disastrous man-made accidents in Thai history.

== Background ==
The Royal Plaza Hotel, in Nakhon Ratchasima Province, Thailand, was hosting two conference meetings at the moment when the collapse occurred. At the time of the collapse, there were 379 people in the building. Of these, 117 were government officials from the Education Ministry, who were attending a seminar in Benchamas Room (เบญจมาศ; RTGS: Benchamat) on the second floor, 59 were from the Shell Company on the fourth floor in Pikul-Chuanchom (พิกุล-ชวนชม; RTGS: Pikun-Chuanchom) Room, and 78 were general hotel clients. The rest of the 125 victims were hotel staff.

== Cause ==
The main reason for the collapse was the addition of floors without properly considering the strength of the structure and soil stability. The original permit, issued in 1983, was for a three-storey building with one underground floor and later during 1985 local authorities approved conversion of the building to a hotel but construction permission was not officially sought for the three additional floors until 1990. There were many errors including not strengthening foundations and columns, and not assessing the strength of the existing columns which later culminated in one of the worst building tragedies of Thailand.

== Aftermath ==
=== Investigation ===
On 15 August 1993, two days after the incident, the Civil Engineering Chapter of the Engineering Institute of Thailand (EIT) immediately established a technical investigation group to support the Task Force at the site. The investigation mainly focused on solving two conundrums:

1. Why did the building last for three years after the additional floors were added? The conclusion agreed by all of the investigating department about the cause of the collapse was unsatisfactory structure after the additional floors; however, instead of collapsing instantly, the building lasted firmly for 3 years.
2. The factors that triggered the collapse of the building, since none of the typical factors causing building collapses (e.g. earthquake, building misuse) were apparent.

Criminal charges were filed against fifteen people, including the hotel owner and management, engineers and municipal officials. Only engineer Bampen Panratissara was found guilty by the Supreme Court, and sentenced in 2003 to 37 years in prison.

=== Compensation ===
In 2009, the Nakhon Ratchasima Court of Appeals charged five defendants for 152.23 million baht as compensation to the companies and the victims' families who suffered from this disaster. These five defendants include Nakhon Ratchasima Municipality, Wongsinthai Limited Partnership, the Royal Plaza hotel owner Amorn Janrattanaprada, engineer Sathorn Promnin, and design-and-construction supervising engineer Bampen Panratissara.

== See also ==
- Gangaram building collapse
