= Ganga Dynasty =

Ganga Dynasty is a name used for two related dynasties who ruled parts of India:

- The Western Ganga dynasty, a kingdom in southern India, based in southern Karnataka, from the 3rd to the 11th centuries
- The Eastern Ganga dynasty, rulers of Odisha from the 11th to the 15th centuries

== See also ==
- Ganga (disambiguation)
