= Bhakta Prahlada (1983 film) =

1983 film directed by Vijay

- Poster
- Directed by: Vijay
- Written by: Vijay
- Screenplay by: Chi. Udaya Shankar
- Produced by: S. A. Govindaraju; V. Bharathraj
- Starring: Rajkumar; Saritha; Ananth Nag; Puneeth Rajkumar
- Cinematography: S. S. Lal
- Edited by: P. Bhakthavatsalam
- Music by: T. G. Lingappa
- Production company: Nirupama Art Combines
- Distributed by: Rajkumar
- Release date: 9 September 1983
- Running time: 148 minutes
- Country: India
- Language: Kannada

Bhakta Prahlada ( transl. Prahalada, the devotee) is a 1983 Indian Kannada-language Hindu mythological film directed by Vijay, and based on the tale of Prahalada. The film stars Dr. Rajkumar, Saritha, Puneeth Rajkumar and Ananth Nag. The soundtrack was composed by T. G. Lingappa. The film won State Film Awards in Sound recording and cinematography categories.

This was the fourth Kannada film on Prahlada after the 1942 film Bhakta Prahlada, 1958 film Bhakta Prahlada and the 1960 film Dashavathara. Of the four films, this was the only one which was not shot in black and white. This movie was dubbed in Telugu as Narasimhaavataaram.

== Cast ==
- Dr. Rajkumar as Hiranyakashipu
- Saritha as Kayadu
- Puneeth Rajkumar as Prahlada
- Ananth Nag as Narada Muni
- Kanchana as Diti
- Sadashiva Brahmavar as Maharshi Kashyapa
- Srinivasa Murthy as Lord Vishnu, Narasimha
- Gangadhar as Devendra
- Thoogudeepa Srinivas as Hiranyaksha
- Shani Mahadevappa as Brahma
- Shivaram as Teacher of Prahlada
- M. S. Umesh as Teacher of Prahlada
- Ambika as Dancer(Guest appearance)
- Rajanand

== Production ==
During the film's shooting, Puneeth Rajkumar was scared of his father Rajkumar's performance and had to be consoled.

== Soundtrack ==
S. No.	Song title	Singer(s)	Lyrics
1	"Govinda Govinda"	Master Lohith	Traditional
2	"Laali Laali Sukumara"	Dr. Rajkumar, Vani Jairam	Chi. Udaya Shankar
3	"Kamala Nayana"	P. Jayachandran	Chi. Udaya Shankar
4	"Priyadim Bandu"	Dr. Rajkumar	Chi. Udaya Shankar
5	"Naa Hege Bannisali"	S. Janaki	Chi. Udaya Shankar
6	"Hari Hari Ennutha"	S. P. Balasubrahmanyam	Chi. Udaya Shankar
7	"Sigivem Kshanadali"	Dr. Rajkumar	Chi. Udaya Shankar
8	"Ela Elavo"	Dr. Rajkumar, Master Lohith	Traditional
9	"Hey Sarasijodbhava"	Dr. Rajkumar	Chi. Udaya Shankar

== Legacy & Influence ==
- Rana Daggubati had revealed that he had referred Rajkumar's performance in this movie for his preparation for the role of Hiranyakashipu.
- The title of the 2019 Kannada movie Avane Srimannarayana was derived from a sequence in this movie - whose clipping was also used for title reveal at the beginning of the movie. It also made use of the clipping of Rajkumar as Hiranyakashipu hitting the pillar (from where Narasimha was supposed to emerge) for its hero introduction shot.
- The 2023 movie Kaiva also used the clipping of the same sequence of Rajkumar hitting the pillar while depicting the real life incident of Gangaram building collapse (1983) which happened adjacent to Kapaali theatre in Majestic area which was screening this movie.
- The 2023 movie Kaatera had a drama scene where the lead actor enacts a famous dialogue sequence [Naa Yaaru.. Kashyapa Brahmana maga] of this movie (even though the story depicted in that movie was a period before the release of this movie).
- The 1996 Kannada movie Sootradaara starring Raghavendra Rajkumar had made use of the famous sequence of Hiranyakashipu hitting the pillar from where Narasimha is supposed to emerge with a comedy twist whereby the lead actor enacting this scene on stage threatens to hit another pillar if his remuneration is not raised.
- The 2024 movie Upadhyaksha had a sequence where the heroine reimagines the hero cleaning the pillar with broomstick as hero in the getup of Hiranyakashipu hitting the pillar with mace saying the famous dialogue Ee Kambadalli?
- The 2026 movie Spark had a version of hero mouthing the famous dialogue Illiyoo Iddaane in his style.
