= HMS Ganges =

Two ships and a shore establishment of the Royal Navy have been named HMS Ganges after the river Ganges in India.

- HMS Ganges (1782) was a 74-gun third-rate ship of the line launched in 1782 and broken up in 1816.
- HMS Ganges (1821) was an 84-gun second rate launched in 1821 and finally broken up in 1930. She was the last sailing ship of the Navy to serve as a flagship.
- HMS Ganges (shore establishment) was a training establishment, originally aboard the second HMS Ganges. She was in service between 1865 and 1976. During this period a number of other ships were renamed HMS Ganges whilst serving as the establishment:
  - HMS Minotaur was Ganges between 1906 and 1908, and again between 1913 and 1919. She was also Ganges II between 1908 and 1912, and again between 1920 and 1922.
  - HMS Caroline was Ganges between 1908 and 1913.
  - HMS Agincourt was Ganges II between 1906 and 1908.
  - RNTE Shotley, a shore based training establishment set up in 1905 was Ganges II from 1913 to 1919, and Ganges from 1927 to 1976.

== See also ==
- Ganges (disambiguation) for other vessels
- Ganges (East India Company ship) for vessels named Ganges that served the British East India Company
