= Gunga Din (disambiguation) =

"Gunga Din" is an 1890 poem by Rudyard Kipling.

Gunga Din may also refer to:

- Gunga Din (film), 1939 film
- Gunga Din (motorcycle)
- The Gunga Din (1998–2000), an American rock band
- "The Ballad of Gunga Din", a song from the Jim Croce album Facets (1966)
- "Gunga Din", a song from the Byrds album Ballad of Easy Rider (1969)
- "Gunga Din", a song from the Libertines album Anthems for Doomed Youth (2015)
