= Ganges (1778 EIC ship) =

British East Indiaman 1778–796

History

Great Britain
- Name: Ganges
- Namesake: Ganges
- Owner: EIC voyage #1:John Durand; EIC voyage #2:Robert Preston; EIC voyages #3-6:William Moffat
- Operator: British East India Company
- Builder: Wells, Deptford
- Launched: 22 October 1778
- Fate: Last listed 1796

General characteristics
- Tons burthen: 758, or 78230/94, or 784 (bm)
- Length: Overall:139 ft 7 in (42.5 m); Keel:112 ft 1 in (34.2 m)
- Beam: 36 ft 3 1/4 in (11.1 m)
- Depth of hold: 15 ft 0 in (4.6 m)
- Propulsion: Sail
- Complement: 100
- Armament: 26 × 6-pounder guns
- Notes: Three decks

Ganges was launched in 1778 as an East Indiaman. She made six voyages for the British East India Company (EIC), and one voyage as a transport for a naval expedition. She was last listed in 1796.

== Career ==
=== EIC voyage #1 (1779–1781) ===
Captain George Richardson sailed from Portsmouth on 7 May 1779, bound for Madras and Bengal. Ganges was at Madeira on 5 April and Gorée on 10 May. She reached Madras on 18 September and arrived at Kedgeree on 11 November. Homeward bound, she was at Barrabulla (near Kedgeree) on 10 January 1780. She was again at Madras on 24 February, and reached St Augustine's Bay (Madagascar), on 14 June, and the Cape of Good Hope on 25 August. She was at St Helena on 29 October, and reached Crookhaven on 9 January 1781. She arrived art The Downs on 8 February.

=== EIC voyage #2 (1782–1785) ===
Captain John Hamilton Dempster sailed from Portsmouth on 6 February 1782, bound for Madras, Bombay, Bengal, and China. Ganges was at Rio de Janeiro on 29 April. She reached Bombay on 6 September and Madras on 19 October, and arrived at Culpee, on the Hooghli River, on 21 January 1783. Ganges was at Sagar Island on 29 April, and Bombay again on 3 August. Bound for China, she was at Anjengo on 19 October, Bencoolen on 11 November, and Batavia on 21 November. She arrived at Whampoa anchorage on 14 February 1784. Homeward bound, she crossed the Second Bar on 24 March. She was at Simon's Bay on 6 September and reached Cork on 8 January 1785; she arrived at Deptford on 9 April.

=== EIC voyage #3 (1786–1787) ===
Captain James Williamson sailed from Portsmouth on 1 February 1786, bound for Madras and Bengal. Ganges was at Johanna on 15 May, reached Madras on 17 June, and arrived at Diamond Harbour on 30 June. Homeward bound, she was at Cox's Island on 29 November, reached St Helena on 24 May 1787, and arrived at Long reach on 28 July.

=== EIC voyage #4 (1789–1790) ===
Captain Joseph Garnault sailed from the Downs on 29 March 1789, bound for China. Ganges reached Whampoa on 25 August. Homeward bound, she crossed the Second Bar on 14 December, reached St Helena on 18 February 1790, and arrived at Long Reach on 26 April.

=== EIC voyage #5 (1792–1793) ===
(5) 1791/2 Madras and Bengal. Captain Garnault sailed from The Downs on 17 January 1792, bound for Madras and Bengal. Ganges reached Madras on 9 June and arrived at Diamond Harbour on 2 July. Homeward bound, she was at "Broken Ground" (probably a location on the Hooghli), on 28 August. She was at Madras on 29 September and the Cape on 7 December. She reached St Helena on 22 December and Falmouth on 22 February 1793, before arriving at Long Reach on 20 March.

=== EIC voyage #6 (1794-1795) ===
By the time Ganges sailed again, war with France had broken out. Captain Garnault acquired a letter of marque on 14 November 1793.

The British government held Ganges at Portsmouth, together with a number of other Indiamen in anticipation of using them as transports for an attack on Île de France (Mauritius). It gave up the plan and released the vessels in May 1794. It paid £458 6s 8d for having delayed her departure for China by 22 days.

Captain Garnault sailed from Portsmouth on 2 May 1794, bound for China. Ganges arrived at Whampoa on 13 October. Homeward bound, she crossed the Second Bar on 13 December, reached St Helena on 13 April 1795, and arrived at Long Reach on 25 July.

=== West Indies expedition (1795–1796) ===
On her return, her owners sold Ganges for breaking up. However, her new owners chartered her to the British government as at transport for Admiral Hugh Cloberry Christian's expedition to the West Indies.

The expedition sailed on 6 October, 16 November, and 9 December, but weather forced the vessels to put back. The fleet finally successfully sailed on 20 March to invade St Lucia, with troops under Lieutenant-General Sir Ralph Abercromby. St Lucia surrendered to the British on 25 May. The British went on to capture Saint Vincent and Grenada.

== Fate ==
Ganges disappeared from online records after 1796. A new Ganges (1797 EIC ship) appeared in 1797 sailing for the EIC.
