= Ranger (1786 ship) =

History

Great Britain
- Name: Ranger
- Launched: 1774, Virginia
- Acquired: 1786
- Fate: Wrecked 1797

General characteristics
- Tons burthen: 300, or 350 (bm)
- Armament: 6 × 4-pounder guns (1781–1783)

Ranger was launched in 1774 in Virginia, possibly under another name. Between at least 1781 and 1786 she was the London transport Thames. Then from 1786 until 1794, she became the Hull-based whaler Ranger. She was wrecked in 1797.

== Career ==
Unavailable issues and missing pages in issues available on line mean that Thames first appeared in Lloyd's Register in 1781.

Year	Master	Owner	Trade	Source & notes
1781	J.Moody	Scott & Co.	New York–London; London transport	LR
1782	J.Moody; A.M'Larty	Scott & Co.	London transport	LR
1784	A.M'Iarty	Scott & Co.	London transport	LR
1786	A.M'Iarty	Scott & Co.	London	LR; thorough repair 1785

In 1786 new owners renamed Thames Ranger, and sailed her as a whaler in the Greenland whale fishery.

Year	Master	Owner	Trade	Source & notes
1786	John Potts	Towers & Co.	Hull–Greenland	LR; thorough repair 1785

Year	Master	Where	Whales	Tuns blubber	Seals
1786	Potts	Greenland	6 (or 8)	86.25	0 (or 149)
1787	Potts	Greenland	6	86.5	0 (or 59 + 2 "sea horses")
1788	Potts	Greenland	4	28	0
1789	Potts	Greenland	1 (or 2)	16	31

Year	Master	Owner	Trade	Source & notes
1790	J.Potts	Captain & Co. Gilder & Co.	Hull–Greenland; Hull–Baltic	LR; thorough repair 1785 & damages repaired 1790
1791	W.Chester; J.Potts	Gilder & Co.	Hull–Baltic; Hull–Greenland	LR; thorough repair 1785 & damages repaired 1790
1792	E.Hall; J.Potts	Gilder & Co.	Petersburg–Hull	LR; thorough repair 1785 & damages repaired 1790
1793	Illegible; M.Newham	Gilder & Co.	Hull–Greenland	LR; thorough repair 1785 & damages repaired 1790

Year	Master	Where	Whales	Tuns blubber	Seals
1791	Potts	Greenland			
1792	Potts	Greenland	3	52.25	0
1793			3	55.5	180
1794	Newham	Greenland			

Year	Master	Owner	Trade	Source & notes
1794	M.Newham	Gilder & Co.	Hull–Greenland	LR; thorough repair 1785, damages repaired 1790, & good repair 1793

== Fate ==
In January 1797 Lloyd's List reported that Ranger, Potts, master, had run aground at Whitby while coming from Shields. It was expected that she would be lost.

Ranger was last listed in 1797 with data unchanged since 1794.
