= Gunga, Bhopal =

Gunga
- village
- Location within Madhya Pradesh Location within India
- Coordinates: 23.4504247°N 77.3618726°E
- Country: India
- State: Madhya Pradesh
- District: Bhopal
- Tehsil: Berasia
- Elevation: 500 m (1,600 ft)

Population (2011)
  - Total: 3,745
- Time zone: UTC+5:30 (IST)
- ISO 3166 code: MP-IN
- 2011 census code: 482299

Gunga is a village in the Bhopal district of Madhya Pradesh, India located in the Berasia tehsil.

== Demographics ==
According to the 2011 census of India, Gunga has 762 households. The effective literacy rate (i.e. the literacy rate of population excluding children aged 6 and below) is 66.18%.

Demographics (2011 Census)
	Total	Male	Female
Population	3745	1882	1863
Children aged below 6 years	596	283	313
Scheduled caste	408	203	205
Scheduled tribe	6	3	3
Literates	2084	1215	869
Workers (all)	1729	1046	683
Main workers (total)	1040	800	240
Main workers: Cultivators	423	328	95
Main workers: Agricultural labourers	333	227	106
Main workers: Household industry workers	11	10	1
Main workers: Other	273	235	38
Marginal workers (total)	689	246	443
Marginal workers: Cultivators	137	35	102
Marginal workers: Agricultural labourers	481	169	312
Marginal workers: Household industry workers	8	2	6
Marginal workers: Others	63	40	23
Non-workers	2016	836	1180
