= SS Eleni (1947) =

German-built cargo steamship

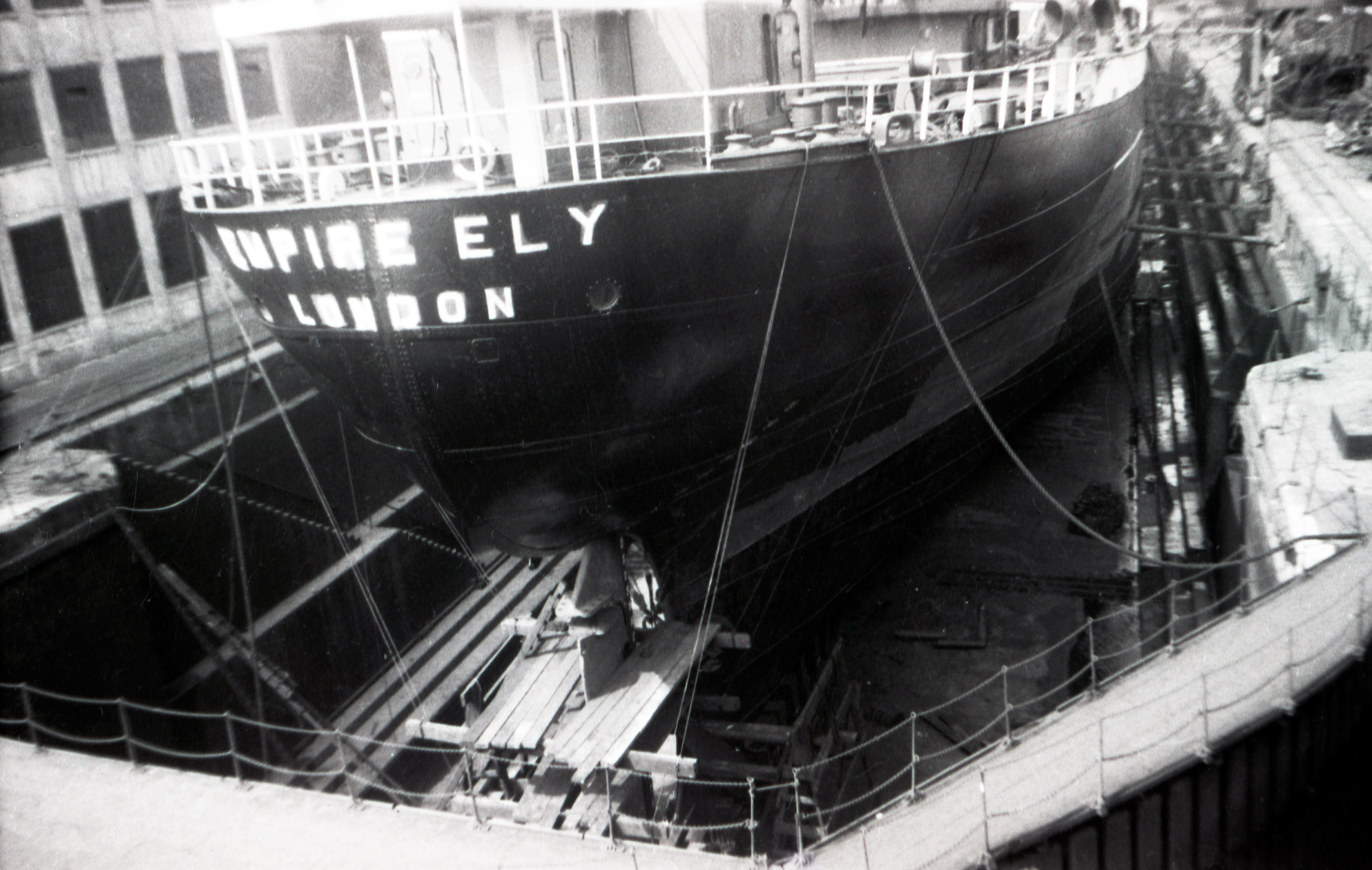
- The ship, as Empire Ely, in dry dock

History
- Name: 1945–47: Greifswald; 1947–54: Empire Ely; 1954–55: Maribella; 1955–59: Ganges; 1959–72: Eleni
- Namesake: 1945–47: Greifswald; 1947–54: Ely, Cambridgeshire; 1955–59: Ganges
- Owner: 1948–54: Ministry of Transport; 1954–55: Mariblanca Navigacion; 1955–59: FA Detjen Reederei; 1959–72: Cia de Nav Andria
- Operator: 1948–49: Common Bros; 1949–50: Sir Robert Ropner & Sons; 1950–51: Maclay & McIntyre; 1951–54: Scott, Mann, & Fleming; 1955–59: DDG Hansa
- Port of registry: 1948–54: (United Kingdom) London; 1954–55: (Liberia) Monrovia; 1955–59: (Germany) Hamburg; 1959–72: Greece
- Builder: Lübecker Flender-Werke, Lübeck
- Yard number: 373
- Launched: 7 November 1947
- Completed: 1948
- Out of service: 5 September 1971
- Identification: IMO number 5100790; UK official number 182863; 1948–54: call sign MAYM; 1955–59: call sign DHNX
- Fate: Scrapped, April 1972

General characteristics
- Class & type: Hansa Type C cargo ship
- Tonnage: 6,113 GRT, 3,537 NRT, 9,650 DWT
- Length: 454.5 ft (138.5 m)
- Beam: 60.7 ft (18.5 m)
- Draught: 25 ft 4 1/2 in (7.73 m)
- Depth: 26.0 ft (7.9 m)
- Decks: 1
- Installed power: compound engine + exhaust turbine; 646 NHP
- Propulsion: 1 × screw
- Speed: 12 1/2 knots (23 km/h)
- Sensors & processing systems: as built: wireless direction finding; echo sounding device; by 1957: as above, plus radar
- Notes: sister ship: Schwarzwald

SS Eleni was a cargo steamship that was launched in Allied-occupied Germany in 1947. She had been laid down during the Second World War as Greifswald for Norddeutscher Lloyd (NDL), but was incomplete when Nazi Germany surrendered in 1945. The UK seized her as part of war reparations, she was launched in 1947, and completed in 1948 as Empire Ely. In 1954 a Liberian company bought her and renamed her Maribella. In 1955 a West German company bought her and renamed her Ganges. In 1959 a Greek company bought her and renamed her Eleni. In 1971 she was damaged in a collision. She was deemed beyond economic repair, and scrapped in Spain in 1972.

== Building ==
During the Second World War, NDL ordered a pair of standard Hansa Type C cargo steamships from Lübecker Flender-Werke, Lübeck. NDL planned to call them Schwarzwald and Greifswald. Neither ship was complete when Germany surrendered in May 1945. The UK authorities seized both ships and had them completed. Schwarzwald was renamed Empire Nene; launched in November 1945; and completed in August 1947. Her sister ship Greifswald was renamed Empire Ely; launched on 7 November 1947; and completed in 1948.

Empire Ely's registered length was 454.5 ft (138.5 m); her beam was 60.7 ft (18.5 m); her depth was 26.0 ft (7.9 m); and her draft was 25 ft 4 1/2 in (7.73 m). Her tonnages were 6,113 GRT; 3,537 NRT; and 9,650 DWT. She had a single screw, driven by a four-cylinder compound engine plus a Bauer-Wach exhaust turbine. Danziger Werft built her compound engine in 1944, and Flender-Werke refurbished it in 1946–47 before finally installing it. The exhaust turbine drove her propeller shaft via a Föttinger fluid coupling and double reduction gearing. Between them, her engines were rated at a total of 646 NHP, and gave her a speed of 12 1/2 knots (23 km/h).

== Empire Ely ==
Empire Ely's first owner was the Ministry of Transport, which had replaced the Ministry of War Transport (MOT) in April 1946. She was registered in London. Her UK official number was 182863, and her call sign was MAYM. In 1948 the MOT contracted Common Brothers of Newcastle upon Tyne to manage her. In 1949, the MOT transferred her management to Sir Robert Ropner and Sons of West Hartlepool, County Durham, and offered Ropner an option to buy the ship. She was going to be renamed Swiftpool, but the sale was aborted. In February 1949, Empire Ely was undergoing minor repairs at Leith on the Firth of Forth when she was offered for sale by public tender. She had not yet been declared a prize of war at the time. She remained unsold, and in 1950 the MOT transferred her management to Maclay & MacIntyre Ltd of Glasgow. In 1951 her management was transferred again, to Stott, Mann & Fleming Ltd of Newcastle upon Tyne.

On 26 August 1952, Empire Ely suffered engine failure when she was 200 nautical miles (370 km) west of Sabang, Indonesia. The salvage tug Griper towed her to Singapore.

== Later owners and names ==
In 1954, Maribella Navigacion bought Empire Ely; renamed her Maribella, and registered her in Monrovia under the Liberian flag of convenience. In 1955, Friedrich A Detjen bought the ship, renamed her Ganges, and registered her in Hamburg. Her call sign was DHNX. DDG Hansa chartered her. In 1959, Compania de Navigacion Andria bought the ship, renamed her Eleni, and registered her in Greece.

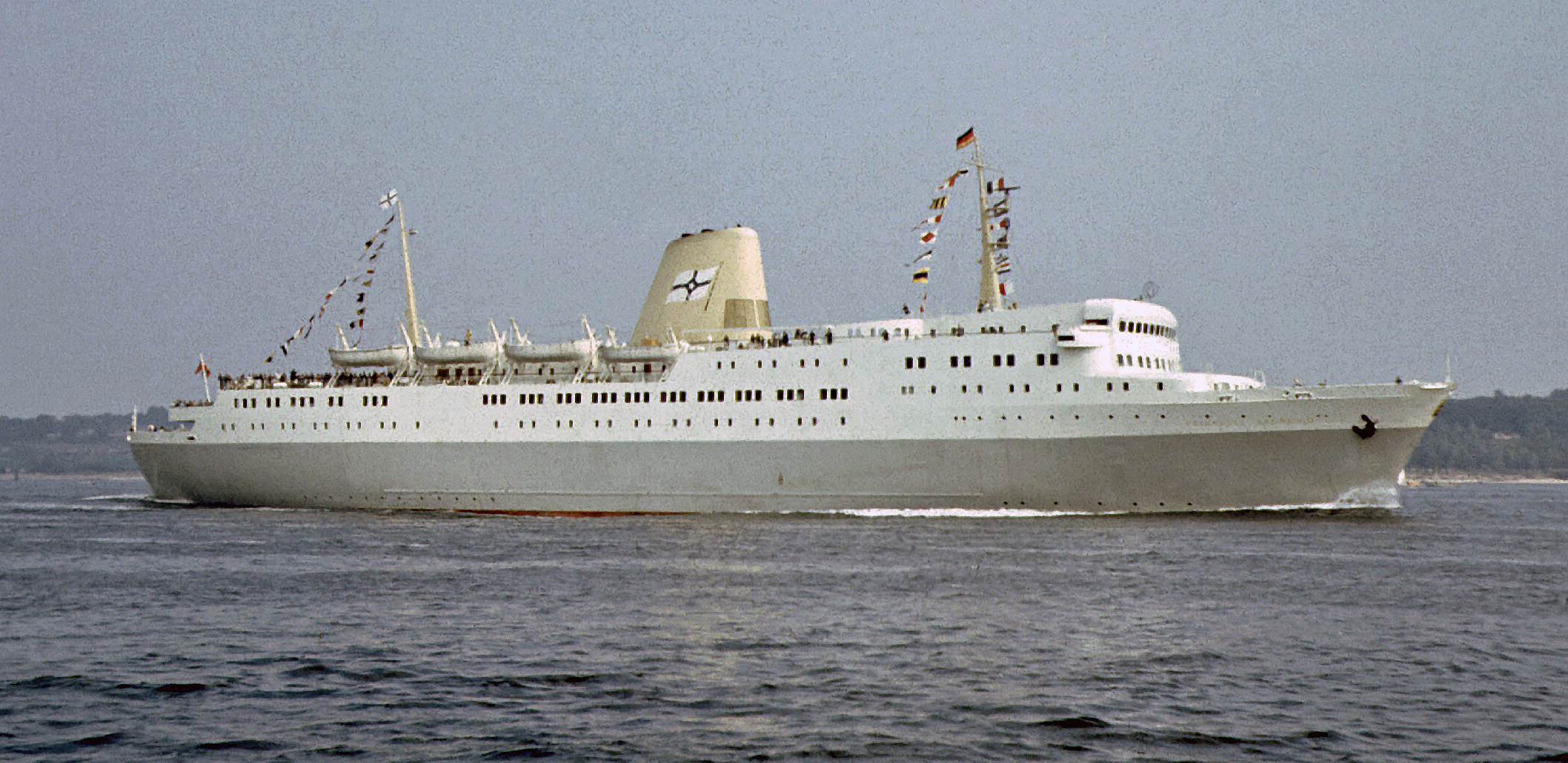
Prinsesse Ragnhild

On 5 September 1971, Eleni was in collision with the Norwegian ferry Prinsesse Ragnhild in the Bay of Kiel. Eleni reached Gdynia, Poland under her own power, but was declared to be beyond economic repair. In April 1972 she arrived in Santander, Spain to be scrapped.

== Bibliography ==
- Mitchell, WH; Sawyer, LA (1995). The Empire Ships. London, New York, Hamburg, Hong Kong: Lloyd's of London Press. ISBN 1-85044-275-4.
- Register Book. Vol. I. A–L. London: Lloyd's Register of Shipping. 1949 – via Internet Archive.
- Register Book. Vol. I. A–L. London: Lloyd's Register of Shipping. 1951 – via Internet Archive.
- Register Book. Vol. II. M–Z. London: Lloyd's Register of Shipping. 1954 – via Internet Archive.
- Register Book. Vol. I. Register of Ships. London: Lloyd's Register of Shipping. 1955 – via Internet Archive.
- Register Book. Vol. I. Register of Ships. London: Lloyd's Register of Shipping. 1958 – via Internet Archive.
- Register Book. Vol. I. Register of Ships. London: Lloyd's Register of Shipping. 1959 – via Internet Archive.
