= Ganges (1799 ship) =

British merchant ship 1799–1805

History

Great Britain
- Name: Ganges
- Namesake: Ganges
- Builder: Hurry & Co., Newcastle-upon-Tyne (equally Shields, and Howdon Pans)
- Launched: 1799
- Captured: Late 1805

General characteristics
- Tons burthen: 458 (bm)
- Armament: 1800:4 × 6-pounder guns; 1802:6 × 12-pounder + 6 × 6-pounder guns; 1806:2 × 18-pounder carronades

Ganges was launched in 1799 at Newcastle-upon-Tyne. She made one voyage for the British East India Company (EIC) bringing rice from Bengal for the British government. She then became a West Indiaman until the French navy captured her in 1805.

== Career ==
Ganges appeared in the Register of Shipping (RS) for 1800 with F.Brown, master, Hurry & Co., owners, and trade Newcastle–London.

EIC voyage (1800–02): Messrs. Prinsep and Saunders tendered Ganges to the EIC to bring back rice from Bengal for the British Government. She was one of 28 vessels that sailed on that mission between December 1800 and February 1801.

On 30 December 1800 Captain Forster Brown sailed Ganges from the Downs bound for Bengal. She arrived at Calcutta on 25 May 1801. She left Bengal on 13 September and reached St Helena on 1 January 1802. She arrived at the Downs on 1 March. (Note: The British Library records combine the voyage of this Ganges and that of Ganges (1792 ship).)

The RS for 1802 showed Ganges still with F.Brown, master, and Hurry & Co., owners, but with trade London–Bengal.

On her return Ganges became a West Indiaman. Lloyd's Register (LR) for 1803 showed her with W.O.Carr, master, Hurry & Co., owners, and trade London–Dominica.

Year	Master	Owner	Trade	Source & notes
1804	W.Carr; P.Scatton	F.Hurry; Brickwood	London–Dominica; London–St Kitts	RS
1806	J.Rand	Boddington	London–St Kitts	RS

== Fate ==
Lloyd's List (LL) for 7 January 1806 reported that Ganges, Rand, master, was one of several vessels that the "Rochfort Squadron" had captured and sent into Teneriffe prior to November 1805. RS for 1806 carries the annotation "Captured" by Ganges's name.

Fortuitously, a flotilla from Rochefort captured a whaler named Ganges around 15 December 1805, or early in 1806.
