= Princess Amelia (1803 ship) =

History

United Kingdom
- Name: Princess Amelia
- Namesake: Princess Amelia of Great Britain
- Launched: America
- Acquired: 1803
- Fate: Broken up circa 1806

General characteristics
- Tons burthen: 290, or 294 (bm)
- Complement: 30
- Armament: 10 × 6-pounder guns

Princess Amelia's origins are obscure. Between 1803 and 1804 she made one voyage from London as a slave ship in the triangular trade in enslaved people. She apparently was broken up in the West Indies after having delivered the captives that she had brought from West Africa.

== Career ==
Princess Amelia first appeared in Lloyd's Register (LR) in 1803.

Year	Master	Owner	Trade	Source
1803	Lathan	Taylor & Co.	London–Africa	LR

Captain Peter Bogle acquired a letter of marque on 24 June 1803. However, he had sailed from London on 26 March. In 1803, 99 vessels sailed from England on voyages to transport enslaved people (hereafter, "captives"); 15 of these sailed from London.

Princess Amelia started acquiring captives on 10 May at Cape Coast Castle. She then gathered more at Whydah, which was where she made most of her purchases. She stopped at Barbados, and sailed for Demerara. She arrived at Kingston, Jamaica, with John Laten, master, on 1 January 1804 with 306 captives. (Note: A Mr P.Bogle, of Princess Amelia, died while sailing from America to the West Indies.)

When she arrived in December 1803, there were already four or five Guineamen (enslaving ships) in port. However, Princess Amelia was able to sell many of her captives while the other vessels faced much greater difficulties. The reason for the discrepancy was that Princess Amelia's captives were coming from the Gold Coast and were in "tolerable condition".

== Fate ==
Princess Amelia then disappeared from Lloyd's List's ship arrival and departure data. She was condemned and broken up after having disembarked the captives she was carrying. Her entry in the Register of Shipping (RS) for 1806 bears the later annotation "Broke up".
