= Ganges (clipper) =

History

United States
- Name: Ganges
- Owner: W.S. Bullard, Boston
- Builder: Hugh R. McKay, East Boston
- Launched: 1854

United Kingdom
- Acquired: May 1863

General characteristics
- Class & type: Clipper
- Tons burthen: 1254 tons
- Length: 192 ft (59 m)
- Beam: 39 ft (12 m)
- Draft: 23 ft (7.0 m)

Ganges was an 1854 clipper ship built by Hugh R. McKay in East Boston. Although she was famed for a race with Flying Cloud and Bald Eagle, the race actually never took place.

== Captain George Blunt Wendell ==
Her captain, George Blunt Wendell (1831–1881) of Portsmouth, New Hampshire, who had apprenticed in the counting house of Goodwin & Coues, was known for his business acumen, unlike many ship masters of the day, who were "found to be a thorough seaman and smart navigator, but a poor merchant."

== Tale of race with Flying Cloud and Bald Eagle ==
The tale of Ganges' race with Flying Cloud and Bald Eagle is an example of how a gripping sea story can have no basis in fact. Arthur H. Clark recounts it as follows:

In 1851, two of the fastest clippers, Flying Cloud and Bald Eagle, left Whampoa laden with tea just two or three days after the Ganges. Ganges appears to have beaten her two rivals to Anjer, in a strong southwestern monsoon, and arrived at the English Channel on 16 December.

On the following morning at daylight we were off Portland, well inshore and under short sail, light winds from the northeast, and weather rather thick. About 8 A.m. the wind freshened and the haze cleared away, which showed two large and lofty ships two or three miles to windward of us. They proved to be our American friends, having their Stars and Stripes flying for a pilot. Captain Deas at once gave orders to hoist his signals for a pilot also, and as, by this time, several cutters were standing out from Weymouth, the Ganges, being farthest inshore got her pilot first on board. I said that I would land in the pilot-boat and go to London by rail, and would report the ship that night or next morning at Austin Friars. (She was consigned to my firm.) The breeze had considerably freshened before I got on board the pilot cutter, when the Ganges filled away on the port tack, and Captain Deas, contrary to his wont, for he was a very cautious man, crowded on all small sails. The Americans lost no time and were after him, and I had three hours' view of as fine an ocean race as I can wish to see; the wind being dead ahead, the ships were making short tacks. The Ganges showed herself to be the most weatherly of the three; and the gain on every tack inshore was obvious, neither did she seem to carry way behind in fore reaching. She arrived off Dungeness six hours before the other two, and was in the London docks twenty-four hours before the first, and thirty-six hours before the last of her opponents.' "

However, the Ganges in question is identified in various sources as a British ship, not an American clipper. Clark adds: "It is always unpleasant to spoil a really good story, but in this instance I feel constrained to point out that the Flying Cloud arrived at San Francisco on August 31, 1851, after her famous passage of 89 days from New York; it is therefore difficult to understand how she could have sailed from Wampoa on the Canton River on or about September 1st of that year, as stated by Mr. Cowper; while the Bald Eagle was not launched until 1852."
