= Carbonear Bay =

Bay in Newfoundland and Labrador, Canada

Coordinates: 47.733°N 53.198°W

Carbonear Bay is a natural bay off the island of Newfoundland, located in the province of Newfoundland and Labrador, Canada. The bay is also home to Carbonear Island.
