= Gangaram building collapse =

1983 construction accident in Bengaluru, India

Gangaram Building Collapse, Bengaluru (1983)

A seven-storey building under construction in Bengaluru, India, belonging to N. Gangaram, collapsed on 12 September 1983 resulting in 123 dead and over 120 injured. This building collapse is considered as one of the worst tragedies of Bangalore city.

== Collapse ==
The seven-storey building, which was going to be a hotel and shopping complex, was located next to Kapali Cinema theatre on Subedar Chatram Road, near the Majestic area. Construction had started in 1981. On 12 September 1983 at 3.25 pm, the building collapsed, killing construction workers, customers of the nearby Gangaram bookstore, pedestrians and two people who were watching cinema in an adjacent theatre. Deaths totaled 123 and there were over 120 injured. The son of N. Gangaram, the owner of the building, was among the dead: his body was not found until the 30th day of rescue work.

== Rescue work ==
During the 1980s, rescue work was a challenge as both technology and techniques were primitive. In addition to the rescue work done by Fire brigade officials, police officials, and volunteers, about 30 mining labourers from Kolar Gold Fields were also involved. The rescue work continued, requiring 34 days, and bodies were recovered out of the collapsed building daily.

== Court acquits ==
The State Government ordered a judicial enquiry and the owner of the building and three contractors were arrested. One reason for the collapse was identified as "structural violations". Charges were filed against Gangaram and contractors, but all six accused were acquitted by Karnataka High Court on 22 February 2005. The court observed that the witnesses were not properly cross-examined by the prosecution.

== Legend ==
Kapaali theatre which was adjacent to Gangaram building was screening the Dr. Rajkumar starrer Bhakta Prahlada (on its fourth day of release) at the time of the disaster. A famous scene in the film where Hiranyakashipu strikes a pillar (from which Lord Narasimha emerges) coincided with the real-life rumble and collapse. The sequence was depicted in the 2023 movie Kaiva.

== See also ==
- Collapse of the Royal Plaza Hotel
