= Princess Amelia (1801 ship) =

United Kingdom ship (1801–1807)

History

United Kingdom
- Name: Princess Amelia
- Namesake: Princess Amelia of Great Britain
- Launched: 1789, France or the Netherlands
- Acquired: 1801 by purchase of a prize
- Fate: Broken up 1807

General characteristics
- Tons burthen: 365 (bm)
- Armament: 6 × 3-pounder guns (1805)

Princess Amelia was a ship launched in France or the Netherlands in 1789, almost certainly under another name. She was taken as a prize in 1801. She made one unsuccessful voyage as a sealer in the British southern whale fishery. Thereafter she became a West Indiaman. She was reportedly broken up in 1807.

== Career ==
Princess Amelia first appeared in Lloyd's Register (LR) in 1801.

Year	Master	Owner	Trade	Source
1801	H.Swain	J.Iggulden	Yarmouth–Southern Fishery	LR

On 24 August 1801 Princess Amelia, Swain, master, sailed from Yarmouth for the Southern Fishery. On 24 September she sailed from Portsmouth; on 29 September she was at Falmouth. She continued on, via Madeira, and was reported to have been "all well" on 8 November at Bonavista while on her way to South Georgia.

In December 1801 Princess Amelia, Swain, master, put into Paramaribo in distress. She was next reported returning to London from Surinam. She was too late to go onto South Georgia for the sealing season, and her captain and five crew members had died. She arrived back at Gravesend from Surinam on 8 June 1802.

In 1802 she was valued at £7,000.

Year	Master	Owner	Trade	Source
1803	H.Swain; J.Jerman	J.Iggulden	Yarmouth–Southern Fishery	LR

Princess Amelia, Jarman, master, was in 1804 next reported sailing as a West Indiaman to Trinidad.

Year	Master	Owner	Trade	Sources & notes
1805	J.Jarman; W.Bailis	Ingulden	London–Trinidad	Register of Shipping; good repair 1803
1806	W.Bailis	Ingulden	London–Trinidad	Register of Shipping; good repair 1803

Princess Amelia, Bailes, master, arrived at Gravesend on 22 October 1805, from Trinidad.

== Fate ==
Princess Amelia was reported to have been broken up in 1807. The registers continued to carry her for several years, but with stale data.
