= Ganges (1798 ship) =

Ship launched in 1798 at Philadelphia

History

Franco-American
- Name: Ganges
- Builder: Philadelphia
- Launched: 1798
- Fate: Sold or transferred to France in 1802

France
- Name: Gange
- Owner: Louis De Baecque
- Commissioned: September 1803
- Home port: Dunkirk
- Captured: Late 1803

United Kingdom
- Name: Ganges
- Owner: Various
- Acquired: 1804; purchase of a prize
- Fate: Either captured and sunk 1806, or released and still sailing until 1814

General characteristics
- Tons burthen: French:310 tons (French; "of load"); British: 243, or 280 (bm)
- Propulsion: Sail
- Armament: 12 × 9-pounder guns

Ganges was a ship launched in 1798 at Philadelphia, probably for French owners. During the Peace of Amiens her registration and homeport became Dunkirk. Her (possibly new) French owners sent her to engage in whaling at Delagoa Bay, where the British letter of marque whaler Scorpion captured her in 1803. She then made one whaling voyage to Isle of Desolation before a French squadron captured her in 1806 during a second whaling voyage. Accounts differ as to whether her captors sank her, or released her and she continued to operate as a merchant vessel until 1814.

== Career ==
Ganges was launched at Philadelphia, possibly for the Rotch brothers. After the outbreak of the French Revolutionary Wars, a number of French whaling companies transferred their operations to the United States, operating out of New Bedford and Nantucket under American colours and with American masters and crews, frequently Nantucket whalers. During the Peace of Amiens (1802–1803), some French owners returned their vessels to French registration, and resumed whaling from France.

Gange was commissioned at Dunkirk circa September 1803 by Louis De Baecque. She departed in late September with Charles Harris (or Harrax), master, for the whaling grounds at Delagoa Bay.

There she encountered Scorpion, which captured Gange and a second French whaler, Cyrus, in late 1803. (Note: Some reports of the capture refer to Scorpion as a British Royal Navy frigate. She was not. She had been a Navy 22-gun sloop until the Admiralty had sold her in 1802 and her new owners fitted her out as an armed whaler sailing under a letter of marque.) (Note: Many of the Nantucket whaling captains were Quakers, who were unwilling to fight.) Scorpion then escorted both into St Helena. From there they sailed to Britain, where they arrived in April 1804 and were sold. Their new owners then fitted them out for whaling and armed them.

Ganges's new owners were James Milman (mast maker), and James Herbert (cooper), or Milner & Co. She sailed from Britain on 4 August 1804 with master C.W. Hodan, or Bacon or Main, for the Isle of Desolation. She was reported to have been there on 25 February 1805. Reportedly she engaged in sealing and the hunt for "sea elephants". She was then reported at St Helena on 16 August 1805. She returned to Britain on 12 September 1805.

== Loss ==
Ganges, Obed Folger, master, and the same owners as on her previous voyage, left on a whaling voyage shortly after returning from her first voyage. While outward bound, she encountered "a flotilla from Rochefort".

The flotilla captured her on 19 December 1805, or 11 March 1806. The French either sank Ganges, or released her, and she continued to operate as a merchant vessel until 1814. Lloyd's Register for 1807 notes that she was captured. If she returned to service, she did not appear in Lloyd's Register for 1808 or 1809.

Fortuitously, the Rochefort squadron had captured a West Indiaman named Ganges prior to November 1805. This coincidence may be part of the reason for confusion but the fate of the Ganges of this article.
