= Ganges (1792 ship) =

History

Great Britain
- Name: Ganges
- Namesake: Ganges
- Owner: Thomas Patrickson
- Builder: India
- Launched: 1792
- Fate: No longer listed in Lloyd's Register for 1803

General characteristics
- Tons burthen: 617, or 700 (bm)
- Complement: 80
- Armament: 12 x 6 & 4-pounder guns, or 12 × 6-pounder guns
- Notes: Teak-built

Ganges was a 700-ton (bm) merchantman launched in India in 1792. She made one voyage under contract to the East India Company (EIC), and one in 1797 transporting convicts from England to New South Wales. She disappears from the registers after 1802.

== Career ==
=== EIC voyage #1 (1796) ===
Ganges, under the command of Thomas Patrickson, left Bengal on 1 February 1796. She was carrying rice on behalf of the British government, which was importing grain to address high prices for wheat in Britain following a poor harvest.

Ganges reached St Helena on 7 April, and arrived at Long Reach on 10 June. (Note: The British Library entry combines this Ganges's voyage and one by Ganges (1799 ship).)

On 17 September 1796 Thomas Patrickson received a letter of marque for Ganges.

=== Convict transport (1797) ===
Ganges appeared in Lloyd's Register (LR) of 1797 with Patrickson as master and owner, and trade London–Botany Bay.

Patrickson sailed Ganges from Portsmouth, England, in early 1797, and she arrived at Port Jackson on 2 June 1797. She transported 203 male convicts, 13 of whom died on the voyage. This was despite Sir James Fitzpatrick, the Home Department's surgeon-general, having ordered the installation of ventilators and water purifiers, and the stocking of fumigants and medicines. Patrickson had asked for 300 convicts, but the request was refused. The guards were a detachment from the New South Wales Corps.

Ganges left Port Jackson in December 1797 bound for China.

Lloyd's Register for 1799 shows Ganges, Patrickson, master, Captain and company as owners, and with trade London-Botany Bay. This entry continued unchanged through 1802, even though there were changes in reality.
