= Ganges (1794 ship) =

History

United Kingdom
- Name: Ganges
- Namesake: Ganges
- Builder: Bombay Dockyard, India
- Launched: 1794
- Fate: Burned and exploded 11 January 1797 or 11 January 1799

General characteristics
- Tons burthen: 130 (bm)
- Sail plan: Brig
- Complement: 107

Ganges was a brig launched at Bombay Dockyard for the Bengal Pilot Service, of the British East India Company (EIC). (She is sometimes referred to as a schooner, but that is more a reference to her role than her sailing rig.) She was burnt in Saugor Roads on 11 January 1797, or 11 January 1799. The accidental fire spread to the powder magazine and the explosion killed eight men. Forty men took to her boat, and 59 to a hastily constructed raft. Six hours after the men took to the raft Laurel rescued all the survivors.
