= Princess Amelia (1793 ship) =

History

United Kingdom
- Name: Princess Amelia
- Launched: 1793, Nova Scotia
- Fate: Wrecked 10 November 1797

General characteristics
- Tons burthen: 172 (bm)

Princess Amelia was launched in Nova Scotia in 1793, possibly under another name. She first appeared in Lloyd's Register (LR), in 1797. She was wrecked in November 1797 on Sable Island, Nova Scotia. Her crew were rescued.

Year	Master	Owner	Trade	Source & notes
1797	C.Wyatt	Watson	London–Halifax	LR
1798	C.Wyatt	B.Watson	London–Halifax	LR

Loss: On 8 November 1797, as Princess Amelia, Wyatt, master, was coming from London when she struck on the south side of Sable Island. The passengers baggage and provisions were saved. A hut found on the island also provided shelter. On 4 December, the schooner Hero, Thomas Cunningham, sailed by the island closely enough that the master could see some 30 men on the island, making signals. The weather was such that the schooner could not provide assistance. Cunningham arrived at Cole Harbour, Nova Scotia in the new year, with the schooner short of supplies and in distress. A local inhabitant provided supplies and Thompson proceeded on his way, leaving behind a memorandum reporting on the survivors. This reached the governor of Nova Scotia. He hired the schooner Black Snake, of Liverpool, Thomas Parker master, with the agreement of the council, and sent it to provide assistance to the survivors of Princess Amelia. Inhabitants of Halifax provided provisions, blankets, and clothing for the survivors.

While this was occurring, Captain Wyatt, the Honourable Lieutenant Cochrane, and four men had decked Princess Amelia's long boat with canvas, and had sailed to an eastern port in Nova Scotia. (Note: Patterson conjectured that Cochrane was Thomas Cochrane, 10th Earl of Dundonald, who would later become a noted admiral. Cochrane had been serving as a lieutenant on the North American station.)

Black Snake left Halifax, Nova Scotia on 12 January 1798. She arrive back at Halifax on 28 January with the remaining survivors. She also left some men on the island to save property and assist vessels.
