= Ranjan Dutt =

Indian air force officer

Air Vice Marshal Ranjan Dutt VrC
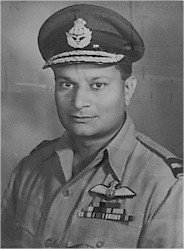

7th Air Officer Commanding-in-Chief Eastern Air Command
- In office 28 October 1966 – 31 March 1968
- President: Sarvepalli Radhakrishnan; Zakir Husain
- Prime Minister: Indira Gandhi
- Preceded by: Yeshwant Vinayak Malse
- Succeeded by: Hirendra Nath Chatterjee

5th Air Officer Commanding-in-Chief Training Command
- In office 23 March 1959 – 12 April 1960
- President: Rajendra Prasad
- Prime Minister: Jawaharlal Nehru
- Preceded by: Kanwar Jaswant Singh
- Succeeded by: Surendra Nath Goyal

Personal details
- Born: 30 September 1921 Bengal Province, British India
- Died: 13 August 2009 (aged 87) Chennai, Tamil Nadu, India
- Spouse(s): Ratina Rawlley (first wife); Claude Marie Dutt De Cavey (died 2010)
- Children: 2, including Ayesha Dutt
- Relatives: Jackie Shroff (son-in-law); Tiger Shroff (grandson); Krishna Shroff (granddaughter)
- Education: RAF Cranwell
- Awards: Vir Chakra

Military service
- Allegiance: British India (1940–1947); India (1947–1968)
- Branch/service: Royal Indian Air Force; Indian Air Force
- Years of service: 1940–1968
- Rank: Air Vice Marshal
- Unit: No. 32 Squadron RAF; No. 94 Squadron RAF; No. 4 Squadron IAF; No. 1 Squadron IAF; No. 20 Squadron RAF; No. 10 Squadron IAF; No. 8 Squadron IAF; No. 2 Squadron IAF
- Commands: Eastern Air Command; Training Command; No.1 Air Force Academy; No. 1 Squadron IAF
- Battles/wars: World War II; Burma campaign; Indo-Pakistani War of 1947

Air Vice Marshal Ranjan Dutt, VrC (30 September 1921 or 1922 – 13 August 2009) was a former air officer of the Indian Air Force. He last served as the Air Officer Commanding-in-Chief Eastern Air Command. Prior to that, he was the managing director of Hindustan Aeronautics Limited.

In 1940 Dutt was one of the 24 Indian pilots seconded to the UK for operational training and squadron service. There, he was selected for fighter training and subsequently spent the summer of 1941 protecting convoys through the English Channel and flying Hurricanes with No. 32 Squadron RAF after the Battle of Britain. He served in North Africa and the Middle-East in the latter part of that year before returning to India to join No. 4 Squadron IAF at Peshawar, North-West Frontier. There, he flew sorties from Miranshah in the Datakhel operations. In June 1944 he became one of the first Indian flight instructors at a training unit in Risalpur. The following year he completed a flight leader course at RAF Tangmere in the UK, and then joined No. 8 Squadron IAF in Mingaladon as a flight commander.

Later, in a senior post at the Operational group, Dutt led several air missions in the Indo-Pakistani War of 1947–1948. On 26 January 1950 he was awarded the second Vir Chakra.

== Early life and education ==
Ranjan Dutt was born on 30 September 1921, or in 1922. (Note: He had claimed to be a year older so that he could join up with the 4th Pilot's course in 1940.) He was educated at Prince of Wales Royal Indian Military College, Dehradun, India. At the age of 16 he gained his civilian pilot "A" licence after taking private lessons.

== Military career ==
=== Second World War ===
In August 1940, Dutt was selected from the fourth pilot's course at the initial training wing in Lahore to travel with another 23 Indian pilots to the UK for operational training and squadron service in preparation to assist in the Battle of Britain. They became known as the X-squad. The youngest of the batch, he later admitted that he submitted an incorrect date of birth in order to qualify for the place. The group's activities received widespread media coverage. The P&O liner SS Strathallan's passenger list records the group's arrival at Liverpool, England, on 6 October 1940. On arrival at London on 8 October, Dutt and his group were welcomed by the Air Minister, Sir Archibald Sinclair, who handed each a note concluding "we shall be proud to have you fighting by our side". That day the group were posted to RAF Uxbridge, and subsequently Dutt was sent with most of the others to No. 12 Elementary Flying Training School RAF at Prestwick to train on Tiger Moths. He completed his advanced training at No. 9 Service Flying Training School at RAF Hullavington, Wiltshire, and received his wings on 16 April 1941. Eight of the Indians, including Dutt, were selected for fighter training at No. 56 OTU at RAF Sutton Bridge. Subsequently, he spent near four months protecting convoys through the English Channel and flying Hurricanes with No. 32 Squadron RAF after the Battle of Britain.

After a year in the UK Dutt was posted to No. 94 Squadron RAF, based in Egypt. Along with Mahinder Singh Pujji, Mian Mohd Latif and Edwin Nazirullah from his initial group, he served in North Africa and the Middle-East in the latter part of 1941. After returning to India he joined No. 4 Squadron IAF at Peshawar, North-West Frontier. No. 4 Squadron was officially formed on 1 February 1942 and at first consisted largely of some of that first batch of 24 Indian pilots of 1940; Pujji, Latif, Nazirullah, Shivdev Singh, and Om Prakash Sanghi. They obtained four Westland Lysanders from Lahore and completed a move to Kohat by 23 February 1942. By March 1942, the squadron had 19 officers and 40 pilots. In May 1942, Dutt flew several sorties from Miranshah in the Datakhel operations; these lasted until mid-August. At the end of 1942 he was posted as flight officer to No. 1 Squadron IAF, also known as the Tigers, at Trichinopoly.

In June 1944, Dutt became one of the first Indian flight instructors at No. 151 (Fighter) Operational Training Unit RAF, Risalpur. He served in the Burma campaign, flying Hurricanes. For a short while he was posted to No. 20 Squadron RAF Arakan and saw action in the Battle of Imphal. He later joined the newly raised No. 10 Squadron IAF in 1944 and replaced Bob Doe's Canadian flight commander. (Note: He may have come to the end of his term of duty or been promoted.). Dutt remained there for the squadron's first operational tours. In August 1945, after completing a flight leader course at RAF Tangmere in the UK, Dutt joined No. 8 Squadron IAF in Mingaladon, as flight commander. There, he substituted the Vic formation with the finger-four formation. In March 1946, Dutt was promoted to squadron leader of No. 1 Squadron RIAF. (Note: No. 1 Squadron IAF was at first raised in 1933, carried prefix Royal between 1945 and 1950, came under Pakistan at partition (1947), disbanded just short of independence and then recreated by India, being formed by 15 Squadron in 1953.) Towards the beginning of 1947, under Dutt's command, the Tigers converted to the Hawker Tempest.

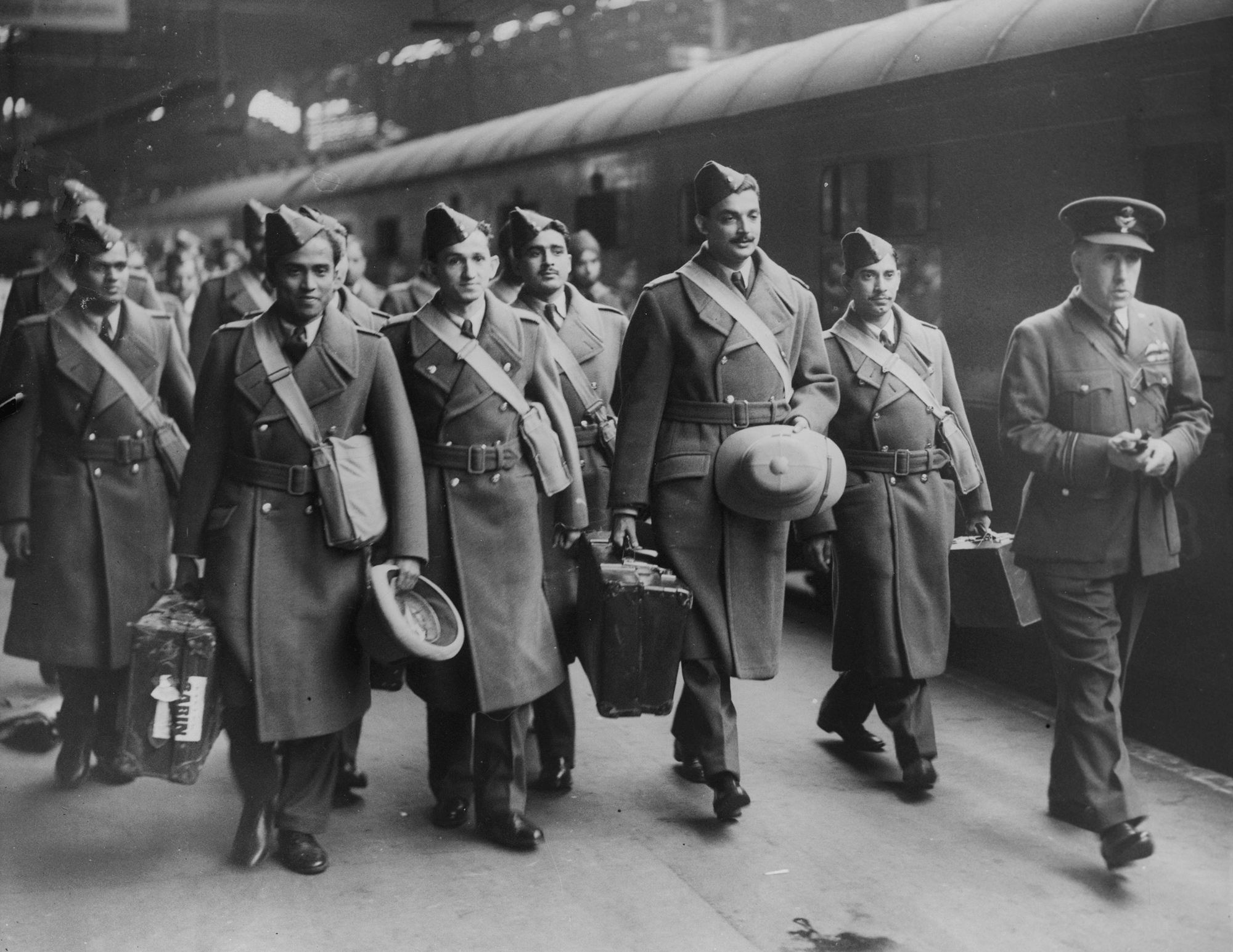
Dutt's group arrive at a London station 8 October 1940

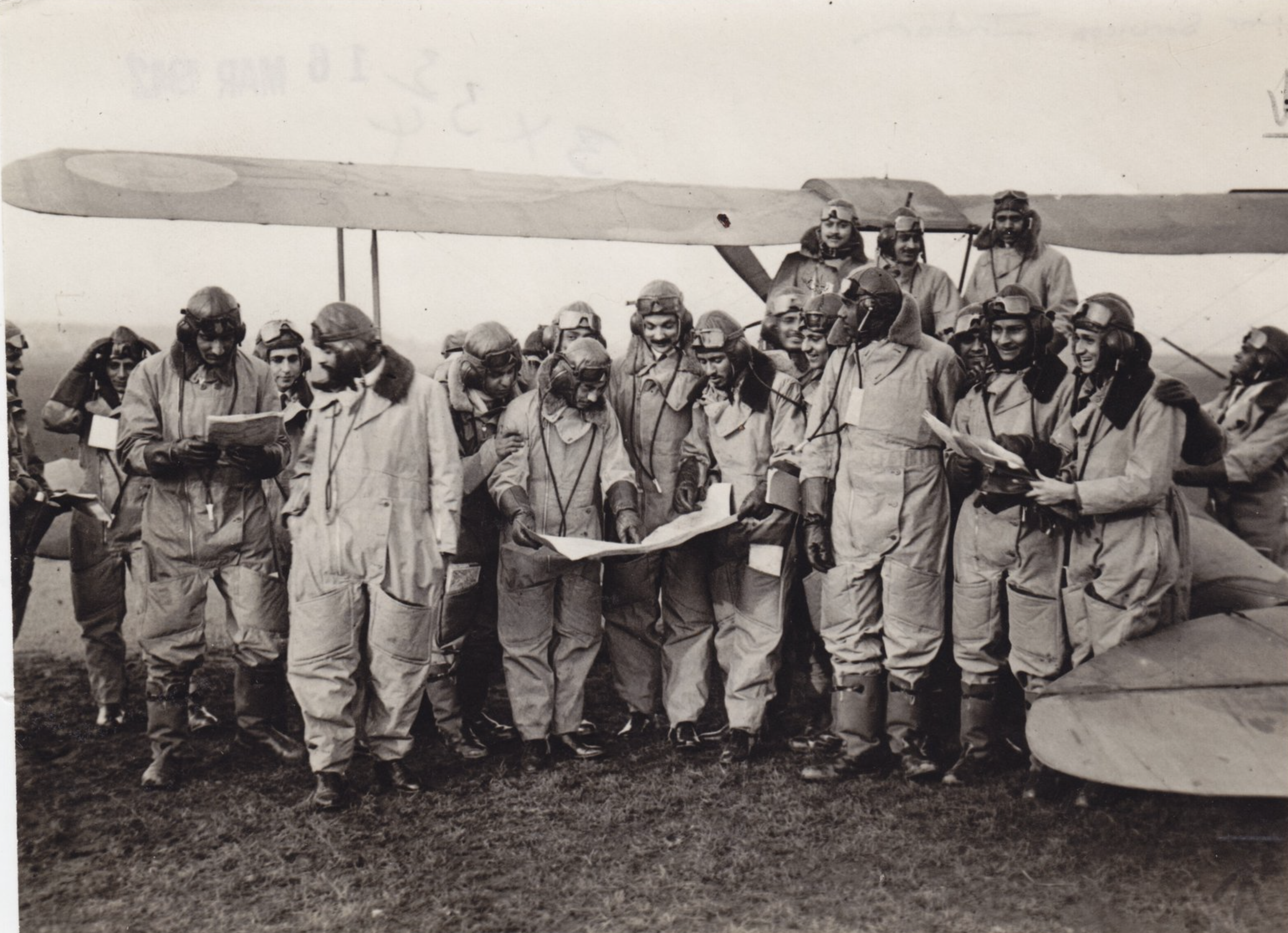
At Prestwick, Dutt is second from right in front row holding a map

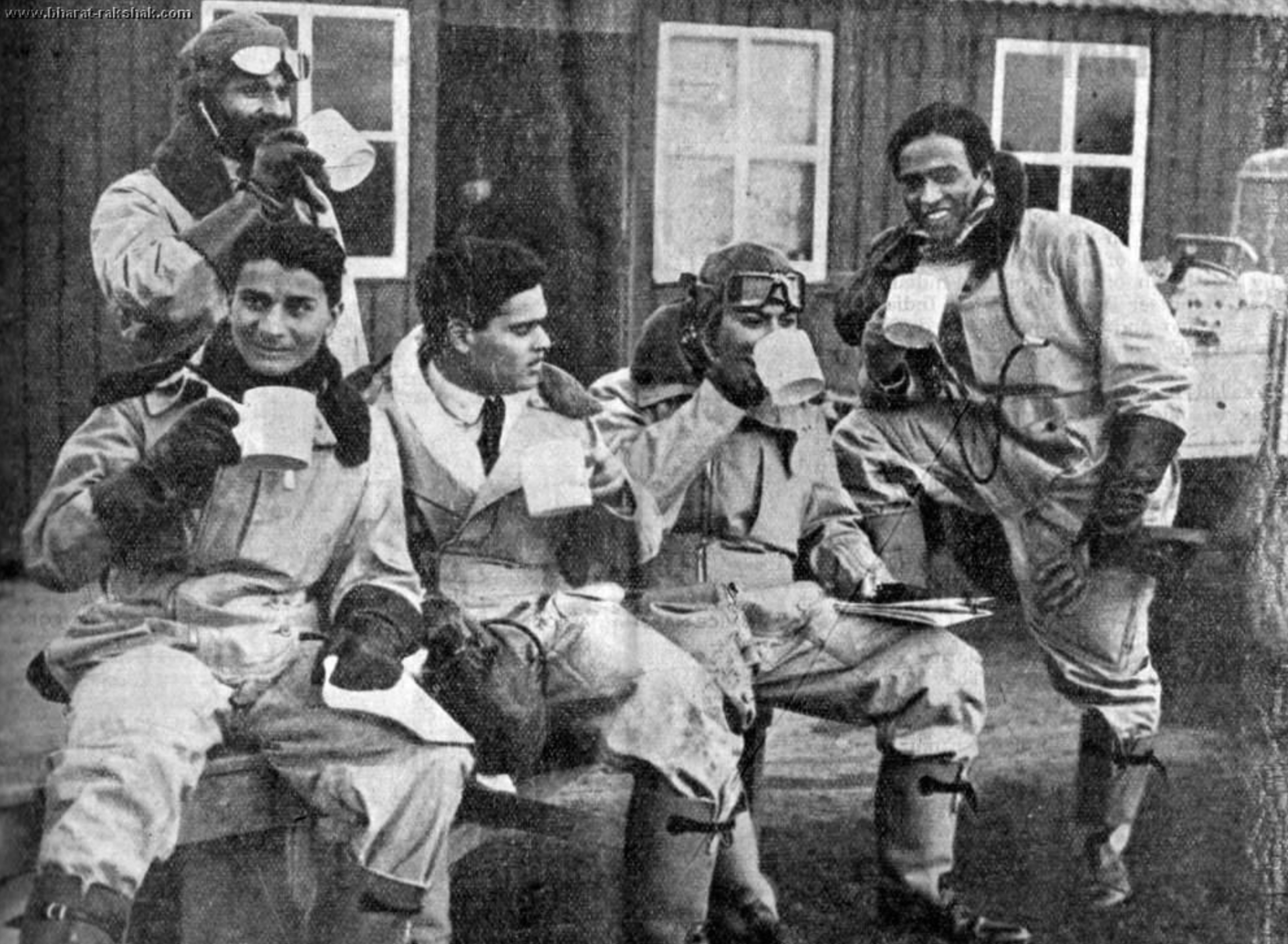
At Prestwick, Dutt seated first on left

=== Post-Independence ===
In August 1947, with the partition of India, Dutt moved to India. In November, he was appointed Senior Air Staff Officer (SASO) of the No. 1 Operational group at Palam; he led several air missions in the Indo-Pakistani War of 1947–1948, including a strike sortie on Kishanganga Bridge. On 1 August 1948, he was promoted to the acting rank of group captain and continued as SASO, No. 1 Operational Group.

=== Vir Chakra ===
On 26 January 1950, with India becoming a republic, the first gallantry awards were announced. Dutt was awarded the Vir Chakra for gallantry for his role in the Indo-Pakistani War of 1947, with the effective date of award of 2 November 1948.

The citation reads as follows:

Gazette Notification: 2 Pres 50, 26-1-50

Effective Date of Award: 02 Nov 1948

CITATION

GROUP CAPTAIN (NOW AIR VICE MARSHAL) RANJAN DUTT

1594 G.D.(P)

Group Captain (Now Air Vice Marshal) Ranjan Dutt (1594), while serving as S.A.S.O Headquarters No. 1 (Operational) Group, took every opportunity to take part in the Kashmir Operations.

This officer had on three occasions led, with distinction attacks on KISHENGANGA Bridge. The first attack resulted in temporary stoppage of movement of enemy troops and supplies over the bridge. When movement again resumed after the bridge had been repaired, reinforced with heavy protective medium 'Flak' he led another formation for the second time. To facilitate his formation to attack, he went low to straff and silenced the gun positions. In spite of his aircraft being hit by enemy fire, he attacked with precision and knocked out one of the gun positions.

Leading a formation of four aircraft, he again attacked the Kishenganga Bridge, undeterred by the fact that his aircraft had been shot up badly the day before. Although his aircraft was damaged by heavy anti-aircraft fire in this sortie also, he attacked with precision and determination and scored a direct hit on the bridge, causing considerable damage to it. After the mission, by great skill, he brought his badly damaged aircraft back safely to the base. He also carried out highly successful reconnaissance sorties and attacks on Gilgit and Skardu.

For the outstanding services rendered by him during the Kashmir Operations, he has been awarded the Vir Chakra.

=== Later career ===
On 1 July 1951, Dutt was appointed Commanding Officer of the No. 1 Air Force Academy (No. 1 AFA) in Ambala. In September, he led the movement of the Academy to Secunderabad. He graduated in 1952 from RAF Staff College, Andover, with a thesis on "Commonwealth Defence". On 1 April 1953, he was made substantive group captain. In 1957, he contributed to the evaluation for the purchase of Hawker Hunters for the IAF. In October 1954, he moved to Air HQ, having been appointed Director, Operations.

=== Air rank ===
After a four-year tenure, on 28 May 1958, Dutt was promoted to the acting rank of air commodore and appointed Air Officer-in-Charge Policy and Plans at Air HQ. This was a short tenure; in March next year, he took over as the air officer commanding Training Command at Bangalore. In April 1960, the post was upgraded to a two-star rank and rechristened Air Officer Commanding-in-Chief. Dutt was promoted to the acting rank of air vice marshal.

By the end of the year, Dutt was appointed the managing director of Hindustan Aeronautics Limited (HAL). At HAL, he led the procurement of HAL HF-24 Maruts designed by Kurt Tank, and later MiG-21s.

After a long six-year stint as the MD of HAL, in October 1966, Dutt was appointed Air Officer Commanding-in-Chief Eastern Air Command at Shillong. He served as the AOC-in-C for two years. At the completion of tenure in air rank, he retired on 31 May 1968.

== Personal life ==
Dutt married Ratina Rawlley in the 1950's and had one son, Shunith Dutt. The pair then divorced and Ranjan married Claude Marie De Cavey from Belgium. Their daughter is Ayesha Dutt, who is married to Jackie Shroff, and his grandson is Tiger Shroff.

== Awards and decorations ==
Dutt had served North Africa and the Middle-East long enough to wear the Africa Star. Later, he qualified for the Air Crew Europe Star. On 26 January 1950 he was awarded the Vir Chakra.

== Death ==
Dutt died on 13 August 2009 in Chennai. He had returned to India from Europe earlier in the year and was cared for by his son, Shunith Dutt, till his death.

== Bibliography ==
- Nair, K. S. (2019). The Forgotten Few; The Indian Air Force in World War II. Noida, UP: Harper Collins. pp. 42–70. ISBN 978-93-5357-067-5.

Military offices
Preceded by Edwin Nazirullah	Commanding officer No. 1 Squadron IAF; 1946–1947	Succeeded by Anand Ramdas Pandit
Preceded by K. Jaswant-Singh	Air Officer Commanding-in-Chief Training Command; 1959–1960	Succeeded by Surendra Nath Goyal
Preceded by Yeshwant Vinayak Malse	Air Officer Commanding-in-Chief Eastern Air Command; 1966–1968	Succeeded by Hirendra Nath Chatterjee
