= Abhisheki =

Abhisheki is an Indian (Konkani) surname. Notable people with the surname include:

- Jitendra Abhisheki (1929–1998), Indian singer and composer
- Shounak Abhisheki, Indian singer and composer, son of Jitendra

== See also ==
- Abhishek (disambiguation)
