= Khatron Ke Khiladi 14 =

Indian reality and stunt television series

Fear Factor: Khatron Ke Khiladi
- Season 14
- Native name: Darr Ki Nayi Kahaaniyaan In Romania
- Starring: See Below
- Presented by: Rohit Shetty
- No. of contestants: 12
- Winner: Karanveer Mehra
- Runner-up: Krishna Shroff
- No. of episodes: 20

Release
- Original network: Colors TV
- Original release: 27 July – 29 September 2024

Season chronology
- ← Previous; Season 13 Next → Season 15

Fear Factor:Darr Ki Nayi Kahaaniyaan In Romania is the fourteenth season of Fear Factor: Khatron Ke Khiladi, an Indian reality and stunt television series produced by Endemol Shine India. The show premiered from 27 July 2024 to 29 September 2024 on Colors TV and streams digitally on JioCinema. The series is filmed in Bucharest, Romania and is hosted by Rohit Shetty. Karan Veer Mehra emerged as the winner of the season, while Krishna Shroff became the 1st runner-up.

The series was announced in May 2024 with principal photography commencing the following month.

== Contestants ==
| Contestant | Occupation | Status | Place | Ref. |
|---|---|---|---|---|
| Karan Veer Mehra | Actor | Winner (Week 10) | 1st | |
| Krishna Shroff | Actress | Eliminated (Week 3) | 2nd | |
| Krishna Shroff | Actress | 1st runner-up (Week 10) | 2nd | |
| Gashmeer Mahajani | Actor | 2nd runner-up (Week 10) | 3rd | |
| Shalin Bhanot | Actor | 3rd runner-up (Week 10) | 4th | |
| Abhishek Kumar | Actor | 4th runner-up (Week 10) | 5th | |
| Nimrit Kaur Ahluwalia | Actress | Eliminated (Week 9) | 6th | |
| Sumona Chakravarti | Actress | Eliminated (Week 9) | 7th | |
| Niyati Fatnani | Actress | Eliminated (Week 9) | 8th | |
| Shilpa Shinde | Actress | Eliminated (Week 2) | 9th | |
| Shilpa Shinde | Actress | Eliminated (Week 7) | 9th | |
| Aashish Mehrotra | Actor | Eliminated (Week 5) | 10th | |
| Aditi Sharma | Actress | Eliminated (Week 4) | 11th | |
| Asim Riaz | Model | Ejected (Week 1) | 12th | |

Indicates original entrants
Indicates re-entered entrants

== Elimination chart ==
| | Week | | | | | | | | | | | | | | | | | | | | | | | | | | | | | | | | | | | | | | | | | | | | | | | | | | | | | | | |
| | 1 | | | 2 | | | | | | | 3 | | | | | | | | 4 | | | | | | | | | | 5 | | | | 6 | | | | | | | 7 | | | 8 | | | 9 | | | | | | 10 | | | | |
| | Grand Premiere | | | 2 Minute Stunts^{1} | | | | | | | Red Funda Week^{2} | | | | | | | | Team Week | | | | | | | | | | Bluff Week^{5} | | | | Partners Week^{10} | | | | | | | Strong Khiladi vs. Weak Khiladi | | | Ticket To Finale Week | | | Semi Finale | | | | | | Grand Finale | | | | |
| | 27-28 July | | | 3-4 August | | | | | | | 10-11 August | | | | | | | | 17-18 August | | | | | | | | | | 24-25 August | | | | 31 August | | | | 01 September | | | 07-08 September | | | 14-15 September | | | 21 September | | 22 September | | | | 28 September | | 29 September | | |
|---|---|---|---|---|---|---|---|---|---|---|---|---|---|---|---|---|---|---|---|---|---|---|---|---|---|---|---|---|---|---|---|---|---|---|---|---|---|---|---|---|---|---|---|---|---|---|---|---|---|---|---|---|---|---|---|---|
| Karanveer | WIN | | | 4 | 0 | 1 | 1 | 6 FLAGS | SAFE | | WIN | SAFE | | | | | | | | W | | W | L | | ^{4} | SAFE | | | WIN | | | | SHILPA | WIN | FAIL | | LOST | BTM3 | SAFE | WIN | | | WIN | WIN | WIN | TICKET TO FINALE | | | | | | WIN | WIN | SAFE | WIN | WINNER |
| Krishna | WIN | | | 2 | 0 | 0 | 0 | 2 FLAGS | SAFE | | | | | | LOST; RED FUNDA | LOST; RED FUNDA | BTM2 | RED FUNDA; ELIMINATED | | | W | W | | W | ^{4} | SAFE | | | LOST^{7} | LOST | SAFE | | SHALIN | WIN | WIN | | SAFE | | | WIN | | | WIN | FAIL | | FAIL | | SAFE | SAFE | WIN | FINALIST | FAIL | | WIN | FAIL | 1st RUNNER-UP |
| Gashmeer | WIN | | | 7 | 2 | 1 | 0 | 10 FLAGS | SAFE | | LOST; RED FUNDA | LOST; RED FUNDA | WIN | SAFE | | | | | | | L | L | W | | ^{4} | BTM6 | SAVED | | LOST | SAFE | | | NIYATI | FAIL | SUMONA ^{12} | FAIL | LOST | SAFE | | WIN | | | WIN | FAIL | | WIN | FAIL | WIN | FINALIST | | | FAIL | | WIN | FAIL | 2nd RUNNER-UP |
| Shalin | WIN | | | 3 | 2 | 0 | 0 | 5 FLAGS | SAFE | | | WIN | SAFE | | | | | | | L | | L | | | ^{4} | BTM6 | BTM2 | SAFE | LOST | BLUFF^{9} | | SAFE | KRISHNA | WIN | WIN | | SAFE | | | WIN | | | FAIL | | | WIN | WIN | FINALIST | | | | WIN | FAIL | FAIL | ELIMINATED | |
| Abhishek | WIN | | | 0 | 0 | 1 | 11 | 12 FLAGS | SAFE | | | | | WIN | SAFE | | | | | | W | W | | W | ^{4} | SAFE | | | BLUFF^{6} | | | | NIMRIT | FAIL | | | WIN | | | WIN | | | WIN | WIN | FAIL | FAIL | | SAFE | WIN | FINALIST | | FAIL | | FAIL | ELIMINATED | |
| Nimrit | WIN | | | 0 | 4 | 0 | 0 | 3 FLAGS | SAFE | | | | | | | WIN | SAFE | | ^{3} | | L | L | | L | ^{4} | BTM6 | SAVED | | WIN | | | | ABHISHEK | FAIL | | | WIN | | | LOST | BTM2 | SAFE | WIN | FAIL | | FAIL | | SAFE | SAFE | ELIMINATED | | | | | | |
| Sumona | LOST | SAFE | | 0 | 0 | 0 | 3 | 3 FLAGS | BTM3 | SAFE | | | | | | LOST; RED FUNDA | BTM2 | SAFE | ^{3} | | | W | | L | ^{4} | SAFE | | | LOST^{7} | LOST | BTM3 | SAFE | BTM^{11} | | GASHMEER^{12} | FAIL | BTM3 | | SAFE | LOST | SAFE | | FAIL | | | FAIL | | SAFE | ELIMINATED | | | | | | | |
| Niyati | LOST | SAFE | | 0 | 5 | 1 | 0 | 6 FLAGS | SAFE | | | | LOST; RED FUNDA | LOST; RED FUNDA | WIN | SAFE | | | | L | | | W | | ^{4} | BTM6 | SAVED | | WIN | | | | GASHMEER | FAIL | | | LOST | SAFE | | LOST | SAFE | | FAIL | | | WIN | FAIL | ELIMINATED | | | | | | | | |
| Shilpa | WIN | | | 0 | 1 | 1 | 0 | 2 FLAGS | BTM3 | ELIMINATED | | | | | | | | | | | | L | | L | ^{4} | BTM6 | SAVED | | WIN | | | | KARAN | WIN | FAIL | | LOST | BTM3 | SAFE | LOST | BTM2 | ELIMINATED | | | | | | | | | | | | | | |
| Aashish | LOST | BTM2 | SAFE | 0 | 0 | 1 | 2 | 3 FLAGS | SAFE | | | | WIN | SAFE | | | | | | W | | W | L | | ^{4} | SAFE | | | BLUFF^{8} | LOST | BTM3 | ELIMINATED | | | | | | | | | | | | | | | | | | | | | | | | |
| Aditi | LOST | BTM2 | SAFE | 0 | 0 | 0 | 1 | 1 FLAG | BTM3 | SAFE | | | | | | WIN | SAFE | | | | | L | | L | ^{4} | BTM6 | BTM2 | ELIMINATED | | | | | | | | | | | | | | | | | | | | | | | | | | | | |
| Asim | LOST | EJECTED | | | | | | | | | | | | | | | | | | | | | | | | | | | | | | | | | | | | | | | | | | | | | | | | | | | | | | |

1. All contestants will perform the stunts together in their numerical order and have to collect flags under 2:00 minutes each. The bottom six contestants will be in danger of elimination.
2. Red Fear Funda contestants will perform the stunts until he/she gets rid of it. In the end, whoever has the Red Fear Funda will be eliminated.
3. Captains of respective teams: Blue Team Yellow Team
4. Yellow Team - 50 Points
  Blue Team - 20 Points; Yellow Team won and were exempted from performing the Elimination stunt.
5. Contestants will play Suitcase Bluff that can change dynamics of the game.
6. Exempted from performing.
7. Performed the partner stunt with extra 2 minutes advantage.
8. Received Fear Funda without performing.
9. No second chance, contestant was placed in the bottom directly.
10. Pairs during Partner Week.
11. As nobody chose Sumona, she received Fear Funda and was placed in the bottom directly.
12. Sumona received opportunity to perform and earn immunity for herself. She had to choose a partner among contestants who lost their stunt.

Winner
1st runner-up
2nd runner-up
Finalists
Ticket to finale
The contestant won the stunt.
The contestant lost the stunt and received Fear Funda.
The contestant got rid of Fear Funda by winning pre-elimination stunt.
The contestant was placed in the bottom and performed elimination stunt.
The contestant was safe from elimination by winning elimination stunt.
The contestant was eliminated.
The contestant was ejected.
The contestant was exempted from performing stunt.
The contestant lost in the Immunity / Ticket to Finale / Finale Race.
Injury

== Stunt matrix ==
| Contestant | Grand Premiere | | | 2-Min Stunts | | | | | | Red Funda Week | | | | Team Week | | | | Bluff Week | | | | Partners Week | | | | | Strong Khiladi vs Weak Khiladi Week | | | Ticket To Finale Week | | | Semi Finale | | | | | Grand Finale | | | | |
| Contestant | 27-28 July | | | 3-4 August | | | | | | 11-12 August | | | | 17-18 August | | | | 24-25 August | | | | 31 August-01 September | | | | | 07-08 September | | | 14-15 September | | | 21 September | | 22 September | | | 28 September | | 29 September | | |
| Contestant | Immunity | Pre-elimination | Elimination | Immunity | | | | Pre-elimination | Elimination | Red Funda | | | Elimination | Team | | | Elimination | Immunity | Pre-elimination | | Elimination | Immunity | | | Pre-elimination | Elimination | Immunity | Pre-elimination | Elimination | Finalist | | | Finalist | | Elimination | | | Top 3 | | Elimination | Win | |
|---|---|---|---|---|---|---|---|---|---|---|---|---|---|---|---|---|---|---|---|---|---|---|---|---|---|---|---|---|---|---|---|---|---|---|---|---|---|---|---|---|---|---|
| Karanveer | Water; Balance | | | Height | Height; Electric Current | Tear Gas | Animal | | | Animal | | | | Electric Current | Height; Balance | Height | | Animal | | | | Electric Current | Vehicle | Animal; Water | Height; Balance | Height; Balance | Animal | | | Electric Current | Height; Balance | Vehicle | | | | | | Height; Balance | Electric Current; Bullseye | | Water; Vehicle; Height | Winner |
| Krishna | Height | | | Height | Height; Electric current | Tear Gas | Animal | Animal; Balance | | Animal | | Vehicle | Electric current | Vehicle | Height; Balance | Water | | Animal | Water | Animal | | Fire | Vehicle | | | | Balance; Water | | | Water | Balance; Fire | | Water; Balance | | Height | Electric Current | Water | Water | | Vehicle | Water; Vehicle; Height | 1st runner-up |
| Gashmeer | Water; Balance | | | Height | Height; Electric current | Tear Gas | Animal | | | Animal | Height | Animal | | Vehicle | Height; Balance | Height | | Vehicle | Water | | | Fire | Vehicle | Animal; Water | Height; Balance | | Balance; Water | | | Water | Height; Balance | | Height; Balance | Vehicle | Height | | | Height; Balance | | Height | Water; Vehicle; Height | 2nd runner-up |
| Shalin | Height | | | Height | Height; Electric current | Tear gas | Animal | | | Height | | | | Electric Current | Height; Balance | | Animal | Height | | | Animal; Electric Current | Fire | Vehicle | | | | Height | | | Water | | | Water; Balance | Vehicle | | | | Water | Electric Current; Bullseye | Height | | |
| Abhishek | Height | | | Height | Height; Electric current | Tear gas | Animal | | | Height | | | | Vehicle | Height; Balance | Water | | | | | | Electric Current | | Animal; Water | | | Vehicle | | | Electric Current | Balance; Fire | Vehicle | Water; Balance | | Height | Electric Current | | Water | | Vehicle | | |
| Nimrit | Height | | | Height | Height; Electric current | Tear gas | Animal | Animal; Balance | | Vehicle | | | | Vehicle | Height; Balance | Water | | Vehicle | | | | Electric Current | | Animal; Water | | | Balance; Water | Water | Animal | Water | Height; Balance | | Height; Balance | | Height | Electric Current | Water | | | | | |
| Sumona | Height | Water; Animal; Electric current | | Height | Height; Electric current | Tear gas | Animal | Animal; Balance | Balance; Electric current | Vehicle | | | Electric current | Height; Balance | Water | | | Animal | Water | Animal | Animal; Electric Current | Vehicle | | | | Height; Balance | Vehicle | Water | | Water | | | Height; Balance | | Height | Electric Current | | | | | | |
| Niyati | Animal | Height | | Height | Height; Electric current | Tear gas | Animal | | | Animal | Height | Animal | | Electric Current | Height | | | Height | | | | Fire | | Animal; Water | Height; Balance | | Height | Water | | Electric Current | | | Water; Balance | Vehicle | Height | | | | | | | |
| Shilpa | Animal | | | Height | Height; Electric current | Tear gas | Animal | Animal; Balance | Balance; Electric current | | | | | Height; Balance | Water | | | Animal | | | | Electric Current | Vehicle | Animal; Water | Height; Balance | Height; Balance | Animal | Water | Animal | | | | | | | | | | | | | |
| Aashish | Water; Balance | Height | Animal; Lock & Key | Height | Height; Electric current | Tear gas | Animal | Animal; Balance | | Animal | | | | Electric Current | Height; Balance | Height | | | Water | Animal | Animal; Electric Current | | | | | | | | | | | | | | | | | | | | | |
| Aditi | Height | Water; Animal; Electric current | Animal; Lock & Key | Height | Height; Electric current | Tear Gas | Animal | Animal; Balance | Balance; Electric Current | Vehicle | | | | Height; Balance | Water | | Animal | | | | | | | | | | | | | | | | | | | | | | | | | |
| Asim | Water; Balance | Height | | | | | | | | | | | | | | | | | | | | | | | | | | | | | | | | | | | | | | | | |

== Production ==
=== Development ===
The series was announced in May 2024 on Colors TV. The contestants were spotted at the Mumbai Airport before leaving for Romania on 22 May 2024.

The contestants were spotted at the Mumbai Airport after returning from Romania on 3 July 2024.

=== Filming ===
The principal photography of the series began on 7 June 2024 in Romania. Rohit Shetty took to his Instagram to officially announce the same.

On 1 July 2024, The contestants announced the wrap up of "Khatron Ke Khiladi 14" in Romania.

== Reception ==
Garima of Pinkvilla gave the series 3.5 out of 5, reviewing the premiere episode.

The series premiere episode was reviewed by Grace Cyril for Times Now.
