= Matrix Fight Night =

Indian mixed martial arts promotion

- Type: Privately held company
- Industry: Mixed martial arts
- Founded: 2019
- Founder: Tiger Shroff; Ayesha Shroff; Krishna Shroff
- Headquarters: Mumbai, Maharashtra, India
- Key people: Tiger Shroff; Ayesha Shroff; Krishna Shroff
- Website: www.mfnofficial.com

The Matrix Fight Night (MFN) is an Indian professional mixed martial arts (MMA) promotion Company based in Mumbai, Maharashtra. It is owned and operated by Hindi film actor Tiger Shroff, his mother Ayesha Shroff and his sister Krishna Shroff. The promotion was founded in 2019.

The Shroff family also owns a chain of MMA gyms called MMA Matrix. Matrix Fight Night has hosted 17 premium fight nights as of March 2026, featuring fighters from both India and other countries. MFN has been instrumental in producing several MMA stars including Anshul Jubli and Puja Tomar, both of them have gone on to sign with the UFC.

== History ==
Matrix Fight Night was founded in 2019 by the Shroff family. The shroffs joined forces to establish a premium MMA promotion aimed to improve and shape Mixed Martial Arts in South Asia & Southeast Asia. Matrix Fight Night kickstarted with their debut event (MFN 1) in Mumbai on 12 March 2019. The event was held at the NSCI Dome and featured 7 professional fights.

Anshul Jubli made his professional MMA debut at MFN 2, which was held on 29 June 2019 in New Delhi. Anshul's undefeated streak (5–0) at MFN earned him the opportunity to fight in the lightweight division of Road to UFC Season 1. Anshul won the tournament after beating Jeka Saragih of Indonesia in the finals, thus securing the UFC contract.

MFN expanded globally with MFN 4, choosing Dubai as their international fight capital. Three consecutive editions of Matrix Fight Night, from MFN 4 to MFN 6, were hosted in Dubai. Despite the pandemic, MFN managed to organize events with the assistance of the Dubai Sports Council.

MFN 6 (Anshul Vs Mahmoudiyan) had its first foreign fighter at Matrix Fight Night. In late-2022, Matrix Fight Night announced its partnership with the OTT giant Disney+Hotstar. MFN events are streamed live in India on Disney+Hotstar.

== Format ==
Matrix Fight Night has two formats: International Fight Night and MFN Contenders. International Fight Night showcases the best talent from India and abroad, while MFN Contenders serves as a feeder event for International Fight Night.

The first MFN Contenders event took place in September 2022 in Hyderabad. The three-day event witnessed over 400 fighters competing in various weight categories to earn the MFN Contract.

== Events list ==
MFN has hosted 17 events as of March 2026. MFN 17, the latest event, took place in August 2025 in Greater Noida. Each event features 12 bouts.

#	Event	Date	Venue	Location
18	Matrix Fight Night 18	2 May 2026	Shaheed Vijay Singh Pathik Sports Complex	Greater Noida, India
17	Matrix Fight Night 17	2 August 2025	Shaheed Vijay Singh Pathik Sports Complex	Greater Noida, India
16	Matrix Fight Night 16	28 February 2025	Siri Fort Auditorium	New Delhi, India
15	Matrix Fight Night 15	31 August 2024	Noida Indoor Stadium	Noida, India
14	Matrix Fight Night 14	9 March 2024	Noida Indoor Stadium	Noida, India
13	Matrix Fight Night 13	28 October 2023	Noida Indoor Stadium	Noida, India
12	Matrix Fight Night 12	1 July 2023	Noida Indoor Stadium	Noida, India
11	Matrix Fight Night 11	31 March 2023	Talkatora Stadium	New Delhi, India
10	Matrix Fight Night 10	18 November 2022	Palazzo Versace Dubai	Dubai, United Arab Emirates
9	Matrix Fight Night 9	24 June 2022	Siri Fort Auditorium	New Delhi, India
8	Matrix Fight Night 8	1 April 2022	Siri Fort Auditorium	New Delhi, India
7	Matrix Fight Night 7	10 December 2021	Falaknuma Palace	Hyderabad, India
6	Matrix Fight Night 6: Anshul vs. Mahmoudiyan	24 September 2021	Palazzo Versace Dubai	Dubai, United Arab Emirates
5	Matrix Fight Night 5	15 December 2020	Palazzo Versace Dubai	Dubai, United Arab Emirates
4	Matrix Fight Night 4	28 February 2020	Al-Nasr Sports Club	Dubai, United Arab Emirates
3	Matrix Fight Night 3	20 December 2019	NSCI Dome	Mumbai, India
2	Matrix Fight Night 2	29 June 2019	Siri Fort Auditorium	New Delhi, India
1	Matrix Fight Night 1	12 March 2019	NSCI Dome	Mumbai, India

== Other Events ==
=== MFN Contenders ===
#	Event	Date	Venue	Location
2	2025 MFN Contenders	22-24 August 2025		
1	2023 MFN Contenders	7-9 December 2023	Noida Indoor Stadium	Noida

=== MFN Fight Pass ===
#	Event	Date	Venue	Location
1	Dojo Fight League 1	18 January 2026	The Dojo MMA & Fitness	Vadodra, Gujarat

== Current champions ==
Division	Upper weight limit	Champion	Since	Title Defenses	Sources
Heavyweight	265 lb (120 kg)	Vacant	TBD		
Light Heavyweight	205 lb (93 kg)	Vacant	TBD		
Middleweight	185 lb (84 kg)	Vacant	TBD		
Welterweight	170 lb (77 kg)	(Kyrgyzstan) Darkhanbek Ergeshev	31 March 2023 (MFN 11)	1	
Lightweight	155 lb (70 kg)	(India) Digamber Singh Rawat	2 May 2026 (MFN 18)		
Featherweight	145 lb (66 kg)	Vacant	TBD		
Bantamweight	135 lb (61 kg)	(Nepal) Rabindra Dhant	2 August 2025 (MFN 17)		
Flyweight	125 lb (57 kg)	Vacant	TBD		
Strawweight	115 lb (52 kg)	Vacant	TBD		
Women's Featherweight	145 lb (66 kg)	Vacant	TBD		
Women's Bantamweight	135 lb (61 kg)	Vacant	TBD		
Women's Flyweight	125 lb (57 kg)	Vacant	TBD		
Women's Strawweight	115 lb (52 kg)	(India) Sonam Zomba	2 August 2025 (MFN 17)	1	

== Championship history ==
=== MFN Welterweight Championship ===
77 kg (170 lb)

No.	Name	Event	Date	Defenses
Current	(Kyrgyzstan) Darkhanbek Ergeshev def. Seth Rosario	MFN 11; New Delhi, India	March 31, 2023	1. def. Jason Solomon at MFN 13 on October 28, 2023

=== MFN Featherweight Championship ===
66 kg (145 lb)

No.	Name	Event	Date	Defenses
1	(India) Sanjeet Budhwar def. Atabek Abdimitalipov	MFN 10; Dubai, United Arab Emirates	November 18, 2022	1. def. Shyam Anand at MFN 13 on October 28, 2023
Budhwar was stripped of the title on March 8, 2024 after failing to make weight for his title defense against Abdul Azim Badakhshi at MFN 14.

=== MFN Bantamweight Championship ===
61 kg (135 lb)

No.	Name	Event	Date	Defenses
1	(Pakistan) Uloomi Karim def. Dhruv Chaudhary	MFN 10; Dubai, UAE	November 18, 2022	
Uloomi had to vacate the title due to inactivity
2	(India) Chungreng Koren def. Mohammad Farhad for interim title	MFN 14; Noida, India	March 9, 2024	1. def. Kantharaj Agasa at MFN 15 on August 21, 2024
Current	(Nepal) Rabindra Dhant def. Chungreng Koren	MFN 17; Greater Noida, India	August 2, 2025	

=== MFN Flyweight Championship ===
57 kg (125 lb)

No.	Name	Event	Date	Defenses
1	(India) Angad Bisht def. Mohamed Gamal	MFN 10; Dubai, United Arab Emirates	November 18, 2022	
Angad vacated the title when he signed with the Road to UFC.

=== MFN Women's Strawweight Championship ===
52 kg (115 lb)

No.	Name	Event	Date	Defenses
1	(India) Puja Tomar def. Bi Nguyen	MFN 10; Dubai, United Arab Emirates	November 18, 2022	1. def. Anastasia Feofanova at MFN 12 on July 1, 2023
Tomar vacated the title in October 2023 when she signed with the UFC.
Current	(India) Sonam Zomba def. Anna Safeeva	MFN 17; Greater Noida, India	August 2, 2025	1. def. Alves Maristela at MFN 18 on May 02, 2026

== Rankings ==
=== MFN Men's pound for pound Rankings ===
No.	Name	Record	Weight class	Representing
1	Sanjeet Budhwar	11-2	Featherweight	Haryana
2	Angad Bisht	9-3	Flyweight	Uttarakhand
3	Clinton Kenin D'Cruz	6-0	Flyweight	Karnataka
4	Shyamanand	5-2	Featherweight	Bihar
5	Digamber Rawat	5-0	Lightweight	Uttrakhand
6	Pawan Maan Singh	8-3	Light Heavyweight	New Delhi
7	Chungreng Koren	6-1	Bantamweight	Manipur
8	Rahul Thapa	4-1	Featherweight	Haryana
9	Puniyajit Likharu	4-0	Bantamweight	Assam
10	Sahil Rana	9-1	Bantamweight	Himachal Pradesh
11	Dinesh Naorem	3-0	Flyweight	Manipur
12	Darshanbek Ergeshov	11-2	Welterweight	Kyrgyzstan
