= India One =

Call sign of the aircraft carrying the Prime Minister or the President of India

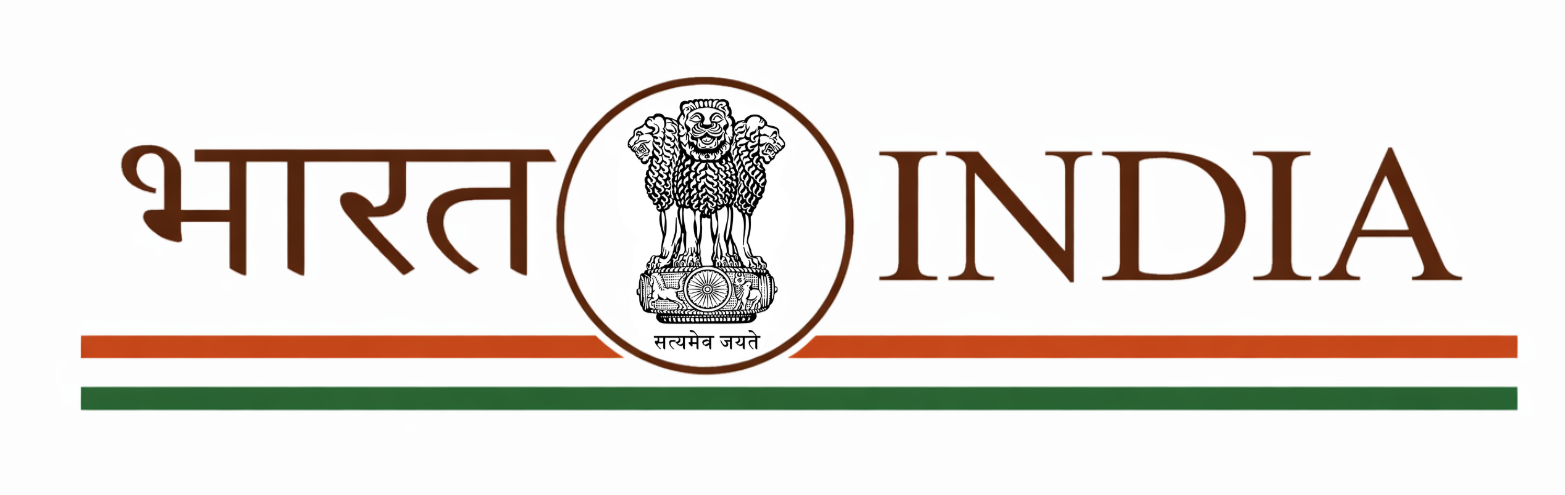

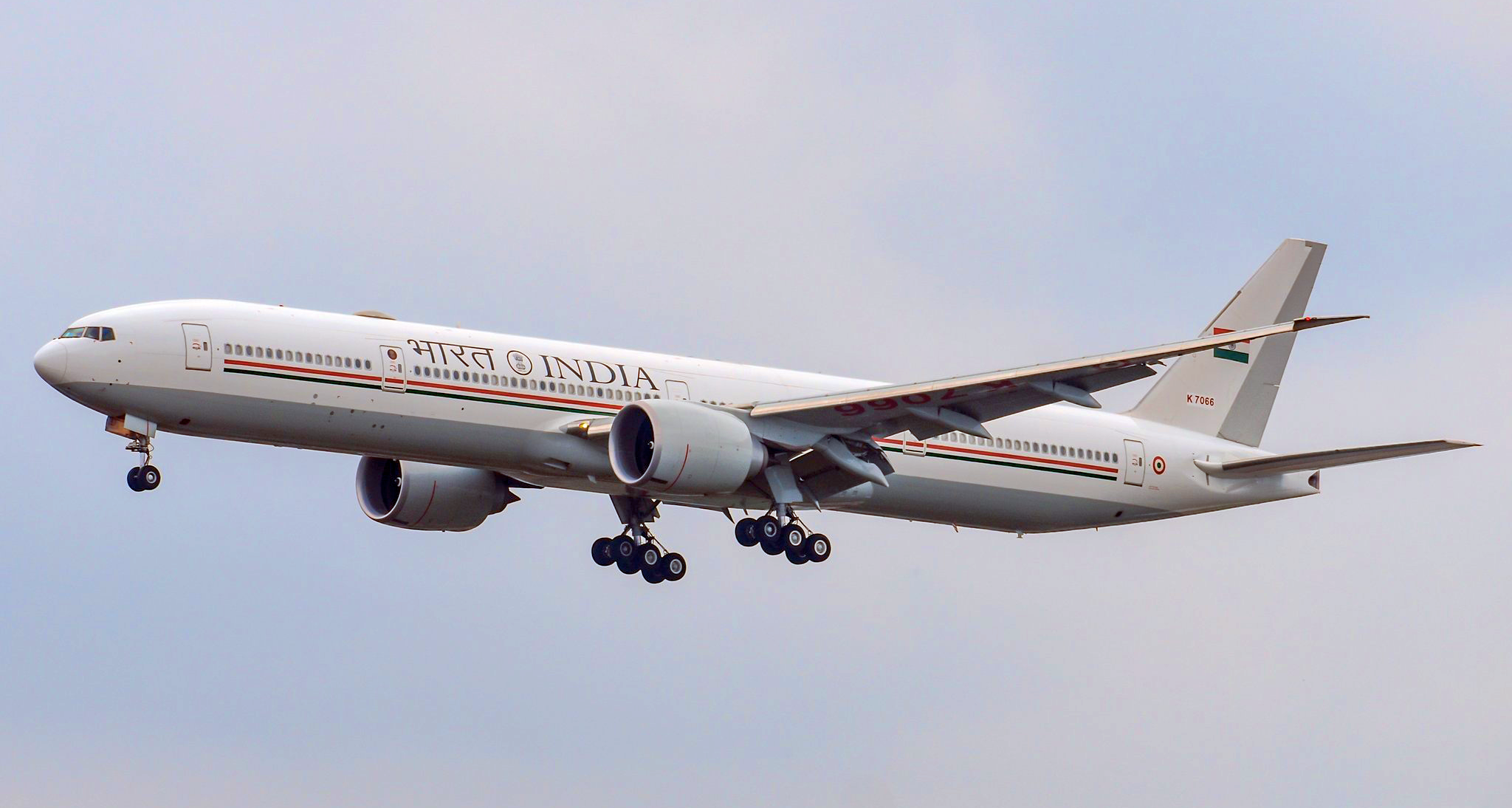
- Livery of India One (above), An India One Boeing 777-300ER (K7066) (below)

General information
- Type: Air transports of heads of state and government
- Owners: Government of India; Indian Air Force
- Primary users: President of India; Prime Minister of India; Vice President of India
- Number built: 2

History
- In service: October 2020

India One (formerly Air India One; also referred to as AI1, AIC1 or INDIA 1) is the air traffic control call sign of any Special Extra Section Flight (SESF) operated by the Indian Air Force (IAF) for the President, the Vice-President or the Prime Minister of India.

The Ministry of Defence and the AHQCS, based at the Palam Air Force Station, Delhi Cantt, New Delhi, India are responsible for coordinating and carrying out the missions.

== History ==
Previously, Air India One was one of two dual-use civilian Air India Boeing 747-400s.

In 2016, two Boeing 777-300ERs were purchased as SESF (VVIP transport). The new aircraft, with specially designed liveries, entered service in October 2020, replacing the Boeing 747-400s operated for the missions by Air India. Unlike the 747s which were commercial aircraft, the newly inducted aircraft are military vessels formally owned and operated by the Indian Air Force. They bear no Air India markings and have no commercial dual-use. However, under a special contract, they will be maintained by Air India Engineering Services Limited (AIESL), which has experience maintaining the Boeing 777 series aircraft for Air India's commercial fleet.

The aircraft are fitted with encrypted satellite communication facilities and advanced navigation aids, an advanced missile warning system, a missile deflecting shield and electronic countermeasures so as to provide protection from any ground-based or airborne threats and flares and glares for misleading the missile. They are capable of long-range travel removing the need for air-to-air refuelling (which is a feature on the VC-25As though they have not been used at all in their service) . The 777-300ERs’ onboard electronics include about 238 miles of wiring (twice the amount found in a normal 777). The heavy shielding is crucial to protect the wiring and crucial electronics from the electromagnetic pulse associated with a nuclear blast.

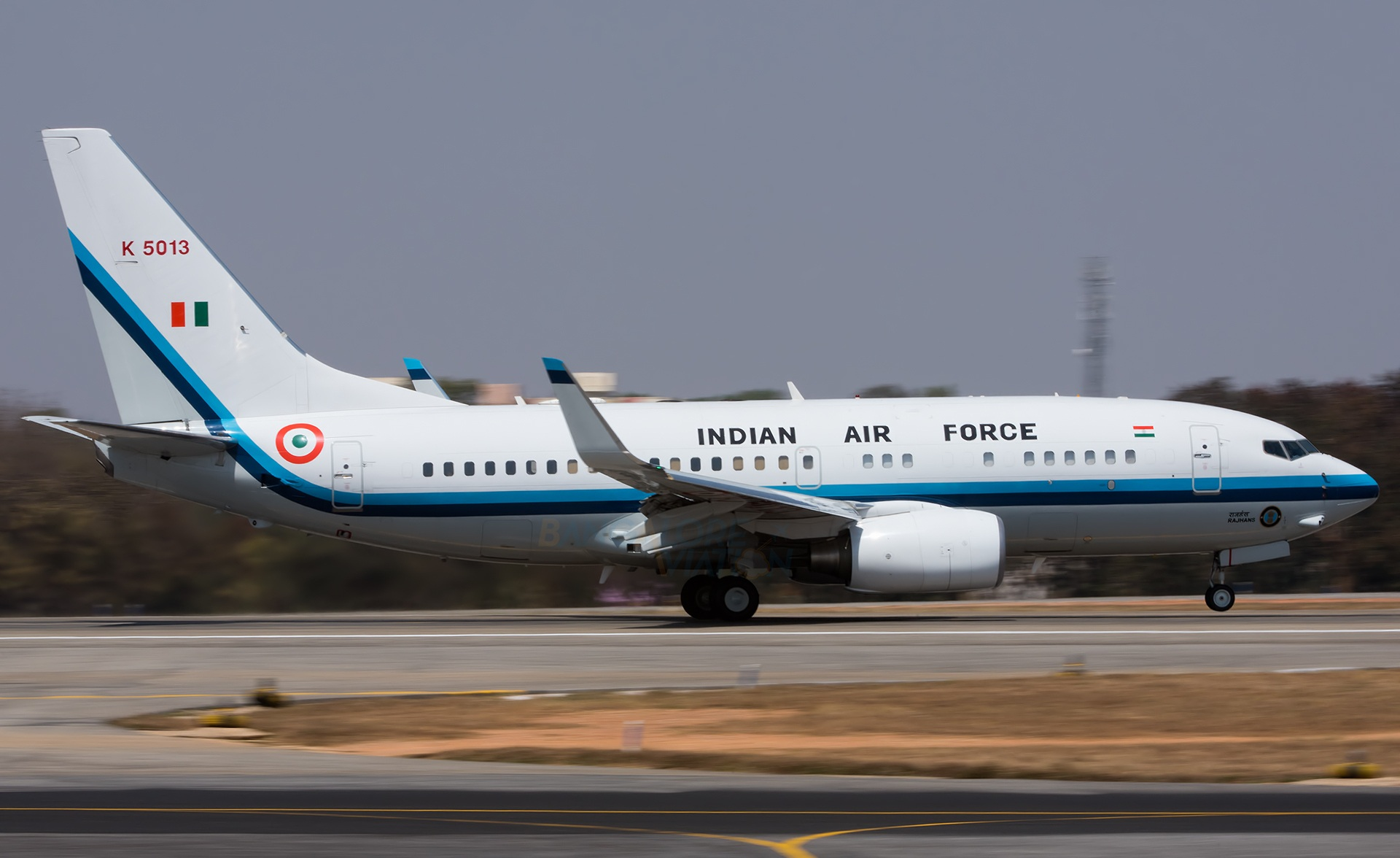
An Indian Air Force BBJ 737, which was used as Air India One for domestic and short-distance travels before Boeing 777-300ER (India One)

At a Boeing facility in Fort Worth, Texas, two ex- Air India aircraft (VT-ALV and VT-ALW, now registered as K7066 and K7067 respectively) were specially outfitted with missile defence and countermeasures dispensing systems, including large aircraft infrared countermeasures (LAIRCM) self-protection suites (SPS).

On India One flights, the President is designated as VIP-1, the Vice-President as VIP-2, and the Prime Minister as VIP-3. The BBJs have a four class configuration. For VIPs 1, 2 and 3, an executive enclosure in the aircraft includes an office and a bedroom. All other passengers aboard India One are required to wear colour-coded identity cards at all times. Members of the official delegation (at the rank of Joint Secretary to the Government of India and above) are tagged in purple and sit in first class. Personnel of the Special Protection Group are also tagged in purple to provide proximate security to the Prime Minister, and may carry close combat weapons for the duration of flights. Accompanying officials (passengers of rank below Joint Secretary) are tagged in pink, and sit in business class equivalent seats. Support staff, including cooks and butlers, and other security personnel (not including the Special Protection Group) are tagged in red, while journalists in the press pool are tagged in yellow. Both red and yellow-tagged passengers sit in economy class equivalent seats.

While Union ministers and senior staff officers of the Indian Armed Forces may use smaller aircraft for official travel, the 777-300ERs are exclusively used by the President, the Vice-President and the Prime Minister of India. Additional Indian Air Force VIP Aircraft such as the B737 BBJ and ERJ-135 are also used by many government dignitaries (including the Prime Minister) for domestic and international medium-haul travel.

== List of other VIP aircraft used by the Government of India ==
The Indian Air Force has a fleet of six Boeing 737s (Business Boeing Jets (BBJ)). Three named and three unnamed for Domestic and International travel of VIPs.

- K5012 : 36106 - Rajdoot
- K5013 : 36107 - Rajhans
- K5014 : 36108 - Rajkamal
- K2412 : MSN 23036
- K2413 : MSN 23037
- K3187 : MSN 20483

Rajdoot is used by the Prime Minister and the other two Rajkamal and Rajhans are used by the President and the Vice-President respectively.

For visiting military areas or places with no aeroplane landing facilities, IAF's Mil Mi-17 are used. A proposal to purchase AugustaWestland AW101 as executive helicopters was cancelled in 2013 following bribery and corruption charges against Finmeccanica.

Other than these, IAF has four VIP Embraer Legacy 600 that are used by the Home, the Finance, the Defence and the External Affairs ministers of India respectively.

- Meghdoot (K601) - Minister of Home Affairs
- Vayudoot (K602) - Minister of External Affairs
- Nabhdoot (K603) - Minister of Finance
- Gagandoot (K604) - Minister of Defence

The rest of cabinet ministers, speaker of the Lok Sabha, deputy ministers (junior and ministers of state) travel in Air India Business class. It is the same for high ranking bureaucrats and Supreme Court judges.

== See also ==
- Air Headquarters Communication Squadron
- Air transports of heads of state and government
