= Abdul Azim Badakhshi =

Afghan-Indian mixed martial artist (born 1995)

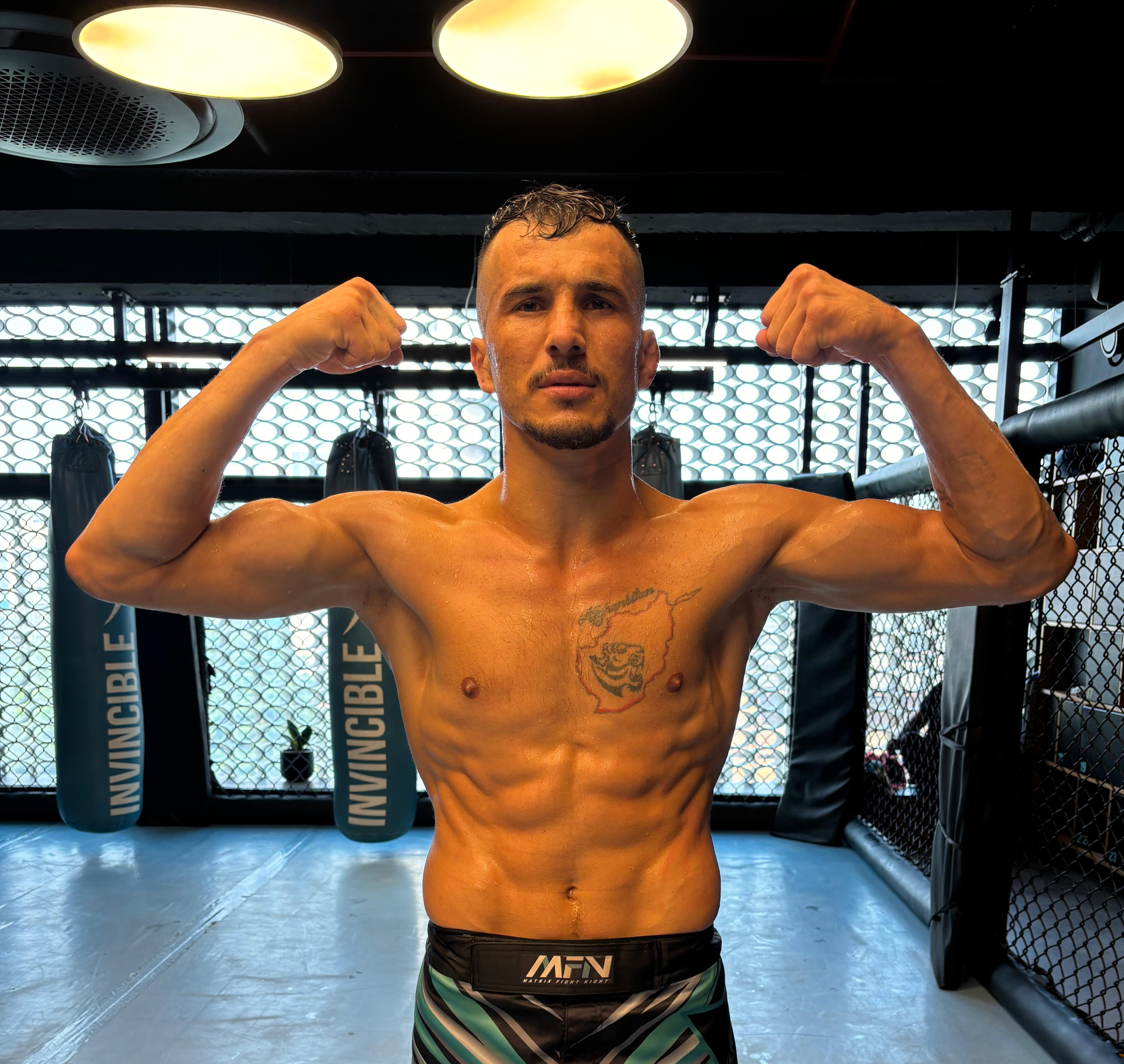
- Badakhshi at Matrix fight Night in 2024
- Born: 20 August 1995 (age 31); Mashhad, Afghanistan
- Native name: عبدالعظیم بدخشی
- Nickname: The Afghan Lion, The Knockout Man of Afghanistan
- Nationality: Afghan-Indian
- Height: 5 ft 9 in (175 cm)
- Weight: 145 lb (66 kg; 10 st 5 lb)
- Division: Lightweight (2013–2018); Welterweight (2018–now)
- Style: Combat Sambo
- Stance: Orthodox
- Fighting out of: Mumbai, India
- Team: MMA Matrix Gym
- Trainer: Nangialai Nikzad
- Years active: 2008–now

Mixed martial arts record
- Total: 20
- Wins: 15
- By knockout: 11
- By submission: 3
- By decision: 1
- Losses: 5
- By knockout: 2
- By decision: 3

Other information
- Mixed martial arts record from Sherdog

Abdul Azim Badakhshi (born 20 August 1995) is an Afghan-Indian former Professional Kickboxer and professional mixed martial arts (MMA) athlete.

== Early life and background ==
Abdul Azim Badakhshi was born on August 20, 1995 in the village of Mashhad in the Kishim District of the Badakhshan province of Afghanistan into an ethnic Tajik family. He has a brother, Abdul Karim Badakhshi who is also an MMA fighter. From a young age, Badakhshi participated in sports, starting with kickboxing. Over the years, through consistent performance, he became recognized as one of Afghanistan's top athletes.

== Career ==
Badakhshi initially started with boxing and soon transitioned to Wushu, where he began participating in professional competitions. His performance in Wushu competitions led to his inclusion in the Afghanistan national team. As a national team member, he represented Afghanistan in several international competitions.

In 2013, after numerous professional boxing and wushu matches, Badakhshi transitioned to mixed martial arts (MMA). Competing in the 76 kg weight class and standing at 180 cm tall, he achieved significant success in various competitions.

With a professional record of 14 wins and 4 losses, he has competed in various global organizations, including Super Fight League (SFL), AFC - Afghanistan Fighting Championship 3, SFL 2017: Semifinals - Ultimate Showdown: Delhi Heroes vs. Goa Pirates, and ACB 86 in Moscow. Through these platforms, he has continually proven his prowess in MMA.

== Controversy ==
In 2023, Badakhshi was set to compete on May 27 at Road to UFC in at the UFC Performance Institute in Shanghai. He was unable to attend because he was incarcerated after fracturing his jaw fellow fighter Srikant Sekhar after in a brawl inside the cage at Matrix Fight Night 9 in New Delhi. Badakshi was accused by Sekhar of sucker punching him and fracturing his jaw. Badakhshi was imprisoned for one year in Indian Tihar jail. He claims the Indian was insulting the Afghan fans. In response to the incident, MFN issued a statement banning all Afghan fighters from competing in the promotion.

== Personal life ==
Badakhshi is a devout Muslim. In a 2023 television interview, Abdul Azim Badakhshi confirmed that he is engaged to Krishna Shroff, the daughter of Jackie Shroff and sister of Tiger Shroff, one of the actors in Indian cinema. He is also involved in human rights activities.

== Mixed martial arts record ==
Professional record breakdown
20 matches	15 wins	5 losses
By knockout	11	2
By submission	3	0
By decision	1	3

Res.	Record	Opponent	Method	Event	Date	Round	Time	Location	Notes
Win	15–5	Artem Buloychik	Submission (anaconda choke)	Indian Fight League: Hyderabad vs. North East	8 August 2026	1	0:19	Hyderabad, India	Return to Lightweight.
Loss	14–5	Nadyr Aliev	Decision (unanimous)	Matrix Fight Night 17	2 August 2025	3	5:00	Greater Noida, India	Catchweight (150 lb) bout.
Loss	14–4	Sanjeet Budhwar	KO (punch)	Matrix Fight Night 14	9 March 2024	2	3:18	Noida, India	For the vacant MFN Featherweight Championship. Budhwar missed weight (149.3 lb) and was stripped of the title. Only Badakhshi was eligible to win the title.
Win	14–3	Park Hae-jin	KO (elbow)	Matrix Fight Night 13	28 October 2023	1	0:18	Noida, India	
Win	13–3	Fabricio Oliveira	Decision (unanimous)	Matrix Fight Night 8	1 April 2022	3	5:00	New Delhi, India	
Win	12–3	Marcelo Guarilha	KO (slam and punches)	Matrix Fight Night 7	10 December 2021	2	3:25	Hyderabad, India	
Win	11–3	Agshin Babaev	TKO (punches)	Brave CF 47	11 March 2021	1	4:23	Arad, Bahrain	Return to Featherweight.
Loss	10–3	Akhmed Magomedov	Decision (unanimous)	Brave CF 45	19 November 2020	3	5:00	Riffa, Bahrain	Catchweight (170 lb) bout.
Win	10–2	Bakhtiyar Arzimanov	TKO (punches)	Snow Leopard FC: Fight Night Afghanistan 9	18 October 2019	2	0:50	Kabul, Afghanistan	
Win	9–2	Mukhammad Sangov	TKO (punches)	Truly Grand FC 3	19 October 2018	1	4:56	Kabul, Afghanistan	
Loss	8–2	Denis Kanakov	KO (punches)	ACB 86	5 May 2018	1	4:04	Moscow, Russia	
Win	8–1	Sascha Sharma	KO (knee)	Super Fight League 2018 Semi-Finals: Bengaluru Tigers vs. Delhi Heroes	10 March 2018	3	0:07	Mumbai, India	
Win	7–1	Manas Daimary	KO (punches)	Super Fight League 2018: Gujarat Warriors vs. Delhi Heroes	3 March 2018	1	0:25	Mumbai, India	
Win	6–1	Ognjen Salatic	TKO (knee to the body and punches)	Super Fight League 2018: Delhi Heroes vs. Tamil Veerans	23 Feb 2018	1	2:57	Mumbai, India	
Win	5–1	David Moon	TKO (punches)	Super Fight League 2018: Delhi Heroes vs. U.P. Nawabs	11 Feb 2018	1	N/A	Mumbai, India	
Win	4–1	Mukesh Gora	TKO (punches)	Super Fight League 2017 Semi-Finals: Delhi Heroes vs. Goa Pirates	18 February 2017	1	2:56	Delhi, India	Lightweight debut.
Win	3–1	Sajjad Mohammadi	TKO (punches)	Afghanistan FC 6	24 November 2016	2	2:20	Kabul, Afghanistan	
Win	2–1	Mohammad Fazil Dler	Submission (rear-naked choke)	Afghanistan FC 5	1 October 2015	1	4:32	Kabul, Afghanistan	
Win	1–1	Ismail Haidari	Submission (rear-naked choke)	Afghanistan FC 3	5 March 2015	1	3:07	Kabul, Afghanistan	Featherweight debut. Won the inaugural AFG Featherweight Championship.
Loss	0–1	Narender Grewal	Decision (unanimous)	Super Fight League 19	7 June 2013	3	5:00	New Delhi, India	Bantamweight debut.

== See also ==
- List of male mixed martial artists
