= Puja Tomar =

Indian mixed martial artist

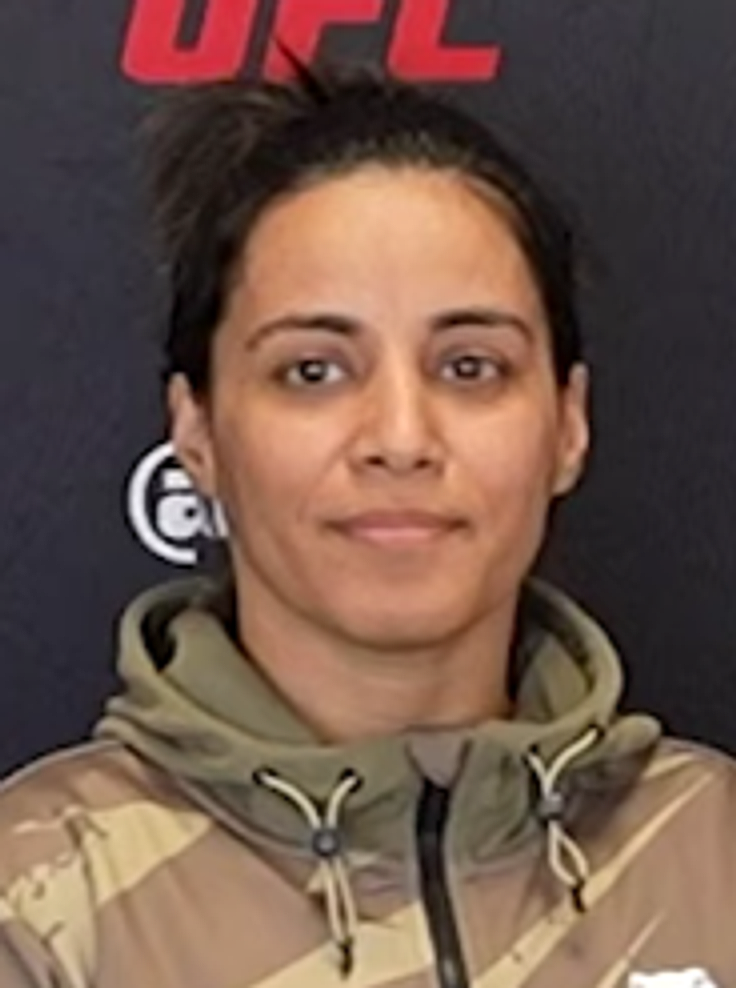
- Born: 5 December 1993 (age 32); Budhana, Uttar Pradesh, India
- Other names: Cyclone
- Height: 5 ft 1 in (1.55 m)
- Weight: 115 lb (52 kg; 8 st 3 lb)
- Division: Bantamweight (2013); Flyweight (2017); Strawweight (2018–2020, 2022–present); Atomweight (2021–2022)
- Reach: 59 in (150 cm)
- Stance: Orthodox
- Fighting out of: Bali, Indonesia
- Team: Soma Fight Club
- Years active: 2013, 2017–present

Mixed martial arts record
- Total: 15
- Wins: 9
- By knockout: 6
- By decision: 3
- Losses: 6
- By knockout: 1
- By submission: 5

Other information
- Mixed martial arts record from Sherdog

Puja Tomar (born December 25, 1993) is an Indian professional mixed martial artist who competes in the strawweight division of the Ultimate Fighting Championship (UFC). She has also competed in Matrix Fight Night and ONE Championship.

== Background ==
Tomar was born in Budhana village in Muzaffarnagar, Uttar Pradesh, India. She began her martial arts training with wushu, eventually representing India at the World Wushu Championship. Facing hardship from an early age, Tomar has often spoken publicly about societal stigma for girls in sports and how martial arts became a means of self-empowerment. She is a Christian.

== Mixed martial arts career ==
=== Early career ===
Tomar turned professional in 2013 and competed in regional promotion, Super Fight League, before she signed with ONE Championship.

=== ONE Championship ===
In the ONE debut, Tomar faced Tiffany Teo on November 24, 2017, at ONE: Immortal Pursuit. She lost the fight via armbar in round one.

Tomar faced Jihin Radzuan on March 9, 2018, at ONE: Visions of Victory. She lost the fight via triangle choke in round two.

Tomar faced Priscilla Hertati Lumban Gaol on January 19, 2019, at ONE: Eternal Glory. She won the fight via split decision.

Tomar faced Stamp Fairtex on January 10, 2020, at ONE: A New Tomorrow. She lost the fight via technical knockout in round one.

=== Matrix Fight Night ===
After released by ONE, Tomar faced Jojo Rajkumari on September 24, 2021, at Matrix Fight Night 6. She won the fight via split decision.

Tomar faced Tenzin Pema on June 24, 2022, at Matrix Fight Night 9. She won the fight via technical knockout in the first round.

Tomar faced Bi Nguyen in a rematch for the inaugural MFN Women's Strawweight Championship on November 18, 2022, at Matrix Fight Night 10. She won the title via technical knockout in the round two.

In the first title defense, Tomar was scheduled to face Feier Huang on July 1, 2023, at Matrix Fight Night 12. However, Huang pulled out for unknown reasons and was replaced by Anastasia Feofanova. She won the fight via technical knockout due to corner stoppage in round four.

=== Ultimate Fighting Championship ===
On October 17, 2023, it was announced that Tomar signed with the Ultimate Fighting Championship (UFC), made her first Indian-born woman fighter in the promotion.

Tomar made her UFC debut against Rayanne dos Santos on June 8, 2024, at UFC on ESPN 57. She won the fight via split decision, becoming the first Indian woman to win a bout in the UFC. All 11 media outlets scored the bout in favor of dos Santos.

Tomar faced Shauna Bannon on March 23, 2025, at UFC Fight Night 255. She lost the fight via armbar in the third round.

Tomar was scheduled to face Shi Ming on May 30, 2026 at UFC Fight Night 277. However, the pairing was pulled in order to serve as the featured bout of the Road to UFC Season 5 quarterfinals event a day earlier on May 29, 2026. She lost the fight via an arm-triangle choke submission in the first round.

== Muay Thai career ==
=== ONE Championship ===
Tomar made her ONE Super Series debut against Bi Nguyen on September 6, 2019, at ONE: Immortal Triumph. She lost the fight via split decision.

== Championships and accomplishments ==
=== Mixed martial arts ===
- Matrix Fight Night
  - Matrix Fight Night Women’s Strawweight Champion (One time)

== Mixed martial arts record ==
Professional record breakdown
| 15 matches | 9 wins | 6 losses |
| By knockout | 6 | 1 |
| By submission | 0 | 5 |
| By decision | 3 | 0 |

| Res. | Record | Opponent | Method | Event | Date | Round | Time | Location | Notes |
|---|---|---|---|---|---|---|---|---|---|
| Loss | 9–6 | Shi Ming | Submission (arm-triangle choke) | Road to UFC Season 5: Opening Round – Day 2 | May 29, 2026 | 1 | 3:12 | Macau SAR, China | |
| Loss | 9–5 | Shauna Bannon | Submission (armbar) | UFC Fight Night: Edwards vs. Brady | March 23, 2025 | 2 | 3:22 | London, England | |
| Win | 9–4 | Rayanne dos Santos | Decision (split) | UFC on ESPN: Cannonier vs. Imavov | June 8, 2024 | 3 | 5:00 | Louisville, Kentucky, United States | |
| Win | 8–4 | Anastasia Feofanova | TKO (corner stoppage) | Matrix Fight Night 12 | July 1, 2023 | 4 | 5:00 | Noida, India | Defended the MFN Women's Strawweight Championship. |
| Win | 7–4 | Bi Nguyen | TKO (punches) | Matrix Fight Night 10 | November 18, 2022 | 2 | 2:52 | Dubai, United Arab Emirates | Return to Strawweight. Won the inaugural MFN Women's Strawweight Championship. |
| Win | 6–4 | Tenzin Pema | TKO (punches) | Matrix Fight Night 9 | June 24, 2022 | 1 | 0:20 | New Delhi, India | |
| Win | 5–4 | Jojo Rajkumari | Decision (split) | Matrix Fight Night 6 | September 24, 2021 | 3 | 5:00 | Dubai, United Arab Emirates | Atomweight debut. |
| Loss | 4–4 | Stamp Fairtex | TKO (punches and elbows) | ONE: A New Tomorrow | January 10, 2020 | 1 | 4:26 | Bangkok, Thailand | |
| Win | 4–3 | Priscilla Hertati Lumban Gaol | Decision (split) | ONE: Eternal Glory | January 19, 2019 | 3 | 5:00 | Jakarta, Indonesia | |
| Loss | 3–3 | Jihin Radzuan | Submission (triangle choke) | ONE: Visions of Victory | March 9, 2018 | 2 | 2:23 | Kuala Lumpur, Malaysia | Strawweight debut. |
| Loss | 3–2 | Tiffany Teo | Submission (armbar) | ONE: Immortal Pursuit | November 24, 2017 | 1 | 4:07 | Kallang, Singapore | |
| Win | 3–1 | Thulasi Helen | TKO (punches) | Super Fight League 2017: Highway to Hurt | February 12, 2017 | 2 | 1:32 | New Delhi, India | |
| Loss | 2–1 | Hannah Kampf | Submission (armbar) | Super Fight League 2017: Metro Mayhem | February 3, 2017 | 3 | 2:01 | New Delhi, India | Flyweight debut. |
| Win | 2–0 | Ishu Sood | KO (punch) | Super Fight League: Contenders 17 | October 19, 2013 | 1 | 0:24 | Nasik, India | |
| Win | 1–0 | Priyanka Kadam | TKO (punches) | Super Fight League: Contenders 16 | October 15, 2013 | 1 | 0:21 | Nasik, India | Bantamweight debut. |

== See also ==
- List of current UFC fighters
- List of female mixed martial artists
