= Thulasi Helen =

Indian boxer (born 1986)

- Born: Thulasi Ekanandam; 1986 (age 39–40); Chennai, India
- Other names: Remi
- Nationality: Indian
- Height: 152 cm (5 ft 0 in)
- Weight: 55 kg (121 lb; 8 st 9 lb)
- Division: Flyweight
- Fighting out of: India
- Years active: 2017–2018

Mixed martial arts record
- Total: 4
- Losses: 4
- By knockout: 1
- By submission: 3

Other information
- Mixed martial arts record from Sherdog

Thulasi Ekanandam (born 1986) also known as Thulasi Helen, is an Indian amateur boxer from Chennai who won her first gold medal at the 23rd YMCA Boxing Championship in New Delhi in 2000 in the 42 kg-44 kg weight category. She is sometimes known as “The Lady Muhammad Ali of India” because of her rapid footwork and stinging punches.

== Early life ==
Helen was born in 1986 to a poor family in Chennai. She took up boxing classes at the age of 14 after watching her older sister Saraswathi participate in the sport. It was around the same time that she was forcibly asked to marry a man her father knew from church. She rejected him and ran away from home after disputes with her family. Her parents had been unhappy that she refused to change her religion. She had dropped out of school and was living variously with her grandparents, friends, in hostels, at railway stations and on beaches. She earned money by doing odd jobs like delivering pizzas, driving an auto to survive.

== Boxing career ==
After winning the gold medal in the 42–44 kg category at the 23rd YMCA Boxing Championships in 2000, Ekanandam was selected for special training by the Sports Authority of India. Thereafter, she beat Mary Kom but in 2011 her relationship with the Tamil Nadu state boxing association was soured after she filed a claim of sexual harassment and she was suffering financially. She left the state team at that time and was absent from the sport for some years. She believes that her successes were in spite of discrimination, including by the boxing association of Tamil Nadu, on the basis of her being a Dalit woman.

Helen was working as a fitness instructor in 2016, at which time she had resumed boxing training in the hope of launching a career in the professional ranks. By 2017, she was participating in mixed martial arts events.

== Mixed martial arts record ==
Professional record breakdown
4 matches	0 wins	4 losses
By knockout	0	1
By submission	0	3

Res.	Record	Opponent	Method	Event	Date	Round	Time	Location	Notes
Loss	0–4	Jennifer Gonzalez Araneda	Submission (Armbar)	SFL 18	23 February 2018	1	0:32	Mumbai, India	
Loss	0–3	Simran Singh	Submission	SFL 18	16 February 2018	2	-	Mumbai, India	
Loss	0–2	Puja Tomar	TKO (Punches)	SFL 17	12 February 2017	2	1:32	Mumbai, India	
Loss	0–1	Hannah Kampf	Submission (Arm-Triangle Choke)	SFL 17	22 January 2017	1	0:49	Mumbai, India	

== Sexual harassment and discrimination ==
A.K. Karuna, secretary of the State Boxing Association in India, asked Helen for cash and sexual favours if she wanted to be considered for a government programme that would give her a stable job and she would still be able to pursue her boxing career. Helen realised she is not the only one who has been asked for sexual favours. She complained against Karun and he was arrested. But Helen's boxing club closed down and her chances of winning became slim.

Helen also claims to have experienced discrimination based on her caste. She also said that many girls belonging to lower castes choose boxing as their ticket to a better life.

== Awards ==
- Gold medal
  - 23rd YMCA Boxing Championship, New Delhi, 2000
  - All India Invitation Boxing Championship, Akola, 2003
- Bronze medal
  - International Invitation Boxing Championship, 2002
  - Junior Women's National Championship, 2002
  - International Invitation Boxing Championship, 2005
  - Senior Women's National Championship, 2008:

Helen, who had won 30 medals in total up to 2016, was awarded a World Tamil Chamber of Commerce (WTCC) Achiever Award in 2016. She also received the Sadhanai Thamzhachi, boxer awards from the Governor.

== Film ==
Light Fly, Fly High, a film directed by Susann Østigaard and Beate Hofseth, centres on Helen and depicts a young woman who literally fights for her independence and freedom from an unwanted marriage. The film also won the Oxfam Global Justice Award, the One World Media Awards and the Amanda Award for the Best Documentary. The film was well-received and Dilip Berman of Saathee Magazine said, "The filmmakers have picked a unique angle to discuss entrenched patriarchy and how misogyny can be battled, though perhaps at personal cost."

Helen also claims that the Tamil film Irudhi Suttru is based on her life, although she is not credited for it.

== Personal life ==
After Helen's boxing club closed, she had to get married. However, she divorced her husband just after three months due to various restrictions that he had imposed on her like not working, having a Facebook account, making phone calls among others.
