= Teri Baahon Mein =

- Promotional Poster
- Directed by: Umesh Mehra
- Based on: The Blue Lagoon
- Produced by: Pramod Pedder
- Starring: Mohnish Bahl; Ayesha Dutt
- Music by: Bappi Lahiri
- Release date: 24 June 1984
- Country: India
- Language: Hindi

Teri Baahon Mein (English: In Your Arms) is a 1984 Indian Hindi-language film directed by Umesh Mehra and produced by Pramod Poddar, starring Mohnish Bahl, Ayesha Dutt in the lead roles, with Navin Nischol, Parikshit Sahni, Prem Chopra in addition to Mithun Chakraborty and Parveen Babi in special appearances. The film is a remake of the 1980 American film The Blue Lagoon.

== Plot ==
The story revolves around Manu and Kanchi. As kids, they travel with her parents Balram Singh and his wife, travel through the sea, and their ship is stranded on an island due to heavy storm. The parents die, and the kids are left to survive on the island by themselves. They are later accompanied by an ape Kalu, who becomes their pet. They have to survive harsh climate, and the cannibal people on the island.

After 20 years of searching accompanied by his younger brother, Ajit Singh, Manu's father succeeds in finding them on the island. Ajit tries to kill his brother but in turn Manu kills him and gets wounded. Manu and Kanchi don't survive the attack and die. Manu's father takes their child back with him to the city.

== Cast ==
- Mohnish Bahl as Manu
- Ayesha Dutt as Kanchi
- Navin Nischol as Balram Singh
- Parikshat Sahni as Thakur Vikram Singh
- Prem Chopra as Ajit Singh
- Neelam Mehra as Pammi
- Mithun Chakraborty as Dancer (Guest appearance)
- Parveen Babi as Dancer (Guest appearance)

== Soundtrack ==
The music composed by Bappi Lahiri and lyrics by Amit Khanna.

Teri Baahon Mein

Film score by Bappi Lahiri
- Genre: Feature film soundtrack
- Length: 24:48
- Labels: CBS Gramaphone Records & Tapes

Song	Singer
"Kitne Phool Kitne Ped"	Kishore Kumar
"Money Money Money"	Asha Bhosle
"Deewani Deewana"	S. P. Balasubrahmanyam
"Bolo Ji Bolo"	S. P. Balasubrahmanyam
"ABCDEFG"	Abhijeet, Sharon Prabhakar
