= Abhishek =

- Pronunciation: Sanskrit: [ɐbʰɪʂeːkɐ], Hindi: [əbʰɪʂeːk], Bengali: [ɔbʰiʂek]
- Gender: male
- Language: Sanskrit; Bengali; Hindi; Marathi; Odia; Nepali

Origin
- Origin: Sanskrit
- Meaning: anointing, consecration, coronation
- Region of origin: India

Other names
- Alternative spelling: Abishek

Abhishek is a male given name that has its roots in the Sanskrit word abhiseka. The conceptual meaning of abhiseka is related to purification, cleansing or anointing.

== Notable people ==
- Abhishek Nain (born 1999), Indian field hockey player
- Abhishek Sharma (born 2000), Indian cricketer
- Abhishek Ambekar (born 1991), Indian footballer
- Abhishek Avasthi (born 1982), Indian actor, choreographer, dancer and model
- Abhishek Bachchan (born 1976), Indian actor, entrepreneur, presenter, producer and singer
- Abhisek Banerjee (born 1984), Indian cricketer
- Abhishek Banerjee (born 1987), Indian politician and member of parliament
- Abhishek Bhat (born 1989), Indian cricketer
- Abhishek Chatterjee (born 1964), Indian actor
- Abhishek Chaubey (born 1977), Indian director and screenwriter
- Abhishek Das (born 1993), Indian footballer
- Abhishek Dhar (born 1970), Indian physicist
- Abhishek Hegde (born 1987), Indian cricketer
- Abhishek Jain (born 1986), Indian director and producer
- Abhishek Jhunjhunwala (born 1982), Indian cricketer
- Abhishek Kapoor (born 1971), Indian actor, director and writer
- Abhisek Lahiri (born 1983), Indian classical sarod player
- Abhishek Malik (born 1990), Indian actor and model
- Abhishek Matoria, Indian politician
- Abhishek Mishra (born 1977), Indian politician
- Abhishek Nayar (born 1983), Indian cricketer
- Abhishek Nigam, Indian actor
- Abhishek Poddar (born 1968), Indian businessman
- Abhishek Raghuram (born 1985), Indian singer and vocalist
- Abhishek Raut (born 1987), Indian cricketer
- Abhishek Rawat (born 1980), Indian actor
- Abhishek Ray, Indian composer and singer
- Abhishek Pratap Shah (born 1982), Nepalese politician
- Abhishek Reddy (born 14 September 1994), Indian cricketer
- Abhishek Shankar, Indian actor and director of Tamil films
- Abhishek Sharma (disambiguation)
- Abhishek Singh (disambiguation)
- Abhishek Shukla (Indian Geriatrician and Physician)
- Abhishek Singhvi (born 1959), Indian politician
- Abhishek Varman, Indian film director
- Abhishek Verma (born 1989), Indian archer
- Abhishek Verma (born 1968), Indian arms dealer
- Abhishek Yadav (born 1980), Indian footballer
- Krishna Abhishek (born 1981), Indian actor and comedian
