= Krishna Shroff =

Indian entrepreneur (born 1993)

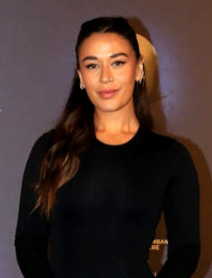
- Shroff in 2025
- Born: 21 January 1993 (age 33); Mumbai, Maharashtra, India
- Education: SAE Institute
- Occupations: TV presenter; investor; filmmaker
- Years active: 2024–present
- Known for: Founder of Matrix Fight Night; Khatron Ke Khiladi 14; The 50 season 1
- Parents: Jackie Shroff (father); Ayesha Dutt (mother)
- Relatives: Tiger Shroff (brother); Ranjan Dutt (grandfather)

Krishna Shroff (born 21 January 1993) is an Indian entrepreneur, documentary filmmaker, and television personality. She is the founder of Matrix Fight Night. She is the younger sister of actor Tiger Shroff and the daughter of actor Jackie Shroff and film producer Ayesha Dutt.

== Early and Personal Life ==
Krishna Shroff was born on 21 January 1993 in Mumbai, Maharashtra, India. She completed her education at the American School of Mumbai. She then went on to complete her bachelor's degree in film production at SAE Institute in Dubai. She is the younger sister of Bollywood actor Tiger Shroff and the daughter of actor Jackie Shroff and film producer Ayesha Dutt.

Shroff has been in a long-term relationship with and is engaged to Abdul Azim Badakhshi, a professional MMA fighter from Afghanistan.

== Career ==
In 2024, she participated in the reality show Fear Factor: Khatron Ke Khiladi 14 on Colors TV. In 2025, she participated in the reality show Chhoriyan Chali Gaon on Zee TV.

Shroff has also produced a documentary about the lives of transgender individuals. She owns the MMA Matrix fitness center in Mumbai, which focuses on mixed martial arts training and overall fitness. She has also worked as a basketball coach for young athletes.

Shroff has been featured on the covers of several fashion and fitness magazines.

== Reality Shows ==
Television
Year	Show	Notes	Ref.
2024	Fear Factor: Khatron Ke Khiladi 14	Runner-up	
2025	Chhoriyan Chali Gaon	Runner-up	
2026	The 50	Finalist	

== Awards ==
In March 2024, Shroff received the Woman Fitness Leader of the Year award from Asian Talks.
