= Air Headquarters Communication Squadron =

- Active: 1 November 1947–present
- Country: India
- Branch: Indian Air Force
- Role: VVIP transport Special Air Missions; Airlift
- Garrison/HQ: Air Force Station Palam, Delhi Cantt, New Delhi
- Nickname: "Pegasus"
- Mottos: Seva Aur Suraksha (Service and Security)

Commanders
- Current commander: Group Captain Saurav Shiv
- Notable commanders: First: Squadron Leader Melville Duarte (01 Nov 1947 – 22 Sep 1948)

Aircraft flown
- Transport: 2 Boeing 777-300ER; 3 Boeing 737 BBJ; 4 Embraer 145; 4 Embraer 135BJ; 5 Mi-17 V-5 helicopters

The Air Headquarters Communication Squadron (Pegasus) (AHQCS) of the Indian Air Force is based at the Air Force Station Palam, Delhi Cantt, New Delhi. It is a transport squadron which maintains a fleet of aircraft with the primary aim of providing air transport to the President, Vice President and Prime Minister of India, within and outside the country, and to visiting foreign heads of State, categorized as VVIPs.

Owing to its unique and often behind-the-scenes role ferrying senior officers and dignitaries, the unit earned the nickname “The Flying Wheelchair” within the service.

== Components ==
The squadron is commanded by an officer of the rank of Group Captain, who is also responsible for operation of VIP aircraft and their maintenance. It operates under the functional and administrative control of the Directorate of Operations (VIP) at Air Force Headquarters through 3 Wing AF at Palam.

The Ministry of Defence regulates the special flights and stipulates as per relevant orders that, with the exception of the President, Vice President and Prime Minister, certain 'other entitled persons' (OEP) can also avail special flights. This includes and is limited to: Minister of Defence, Minister of Home Affairs, Minister of External Affairs, Minister of Finance, ministers of state in the Ministry of Defence, Chief of Defence Staff, chiefs of the three defence services, Defence Secretary, other cabinet ministers, senior service and civilian officers who are connected with defence organisation and Cabinet Secretary.

== History ==
The Air Headquarters Communication Squadron traces its roots to No. 3 Communication Flight, RAF, which operated in India during World War II, providing liaison and staff transport duties. After Independence, the need for a dedicated, centrally controlled air transport unit led to the formal establishment of the squadron under Indian command. The unit inherited both the aircraft and ethos of these wartime communication flights, evolving into the IAF’s primary VIP and administrative flying arm.

Due to the requirement of conveying VIPs in pre-Independence India, a small unit was formed in January 1947 under Wing Commander Bryant Fenner of the Royal Indian Air Force (RIAF) called Communication Squadron (India). This unit came under the command of Squadron Leader Melville Duarte on 1 November 1947 as Air Headquarters Communication Squadron (RIAF) and has been based at Air Force Station Palam ever since. It retained its name after India became a republic on 26 January 1950.

The squadron began operations with war-surplus Airspeed Oxford and Douglas C-47 Skytrain (Dakota) aircraft. It acquired the DeHavilland Dove the following year. The first turboprop aircraft, two Vickers Viscount, were inducted in 1956, but were withdrawn from service and sold in 1967. During his premiership, Prime Minister Jawaharlal Nehru and his family occasionally flew in a VIP Dakota, IJ-817-S, from which his ashes were scattered in the Vale of Kashmir following his death in May 1964.

In 1964, the squadron acquired the Hawker Siddeley HS 748 (Avro), followed by the induction of three VIP variants of the Tupolev Tu-124 in 1966. On 4 November 1977, one of the three TU-124 aircraft (V-643), carrying Prime Minister Morarji Desai and other officials from Delhi to Jorhat, struck trees during its landing approach and crashed with the loss of the crew, though the Prime Minister and the other passengers survived. A subsequent court of inquiry attributed the cause of the accident to a combination of spatial disorientation and pilot error, with the possible failure of a radio-altimeter as a factor. The last of the three TU-124s, Rajdoot, was retired on 13 November 1981, having been replaced by the Boeing 737-200 in October 1980.

== Fleet ==
=== Boeing 777-300ER (India One) ===
In October 2020, the IAF inducted two, fully-customized Boeing 777-300ER aircraft into the squadron at a cost of ₹8,458 Crore. Prior to this, a pair of Boeing 747-400s, operated by Air India, were being used for overseas VVIP transport. The two ex- Air India 777 aircraft underwent major modifications at Boeing's facility in Fort Worth, Texas, where they were fitted with missile defence and communications systems requisite of aircraft conveying Heads of State and Heads of Government.

Each aircraft features a VVIP suite, two conference rooms, a press briefing room, a medical room, and secure communications system with jammers.

The first official use of the VVIP Boeing 777 was on 26 March 2021, during Prime Minister Narendra Modi's visit to Dhaka, Bangladesh.

Aircraft operating VVIP flights are designated Special Extra Section Flight (SESF). On SESF missions, the President is designated as VIP-1, the Vice President as VIP-2, and the Prime Minister as VIP-3. On official mission with any of three VIPs on board, the aircraft are designated the callsign Air India One.

While Union Ministers and senior staff officers of the Indian Armed Forces may use smaller aircraft for official travel, the B777-300ER's are exclusively used by the President, Vice President and Prime Minister.

Passengers traveling on board Air India One are required to wear colour-coded identity cards at all times. Members of the official delegation (rank of Joint Secretary to the Government of India and above) are tagged in purple and sit in first class equivalent seats. Personnel of the Special Protection Group are also tagged in purple since they provide proximate security to the Prime Minister, and may carry close combat weapons for the duration of flights. Accompanying officials (passengers of rank below Joint Secretary) are tagged in pink, and sit in business class equivalent seats. Support staff, including cooks and butlers, and other security personnel (not including the Special Protection Group) are tagged in red, while journalists in the press pool are tagged in yellow. Both red and yellow-tagged passengers sit in economy class equivalent seats.

The B777-300ER's onboard electronics include about 238 miles of wiring (twice the amount found in a normal 777). Heavy shielding is tough enough to protect the wiring and crucial electronics from the electromagnetic pulse associated with a nuclear blast. The aircraft is fitted with encrypted satellite communication facilities and advanced navigation aids, an advanced missile warning system, a missile deflecting shield and electronic countermeasures so as to provide protection from any ground-based or airborne threats.

The B777-300ERs are military vessels formally owned by the Indian Air Force. They bear no Air India markings and will not have commercial dual-use. However, under a special contract, their maintenance will be carried out by Air India Engineering Services Limited (AIESL), which has experience in maintaining the Boeing 777 series aircraft for Air India's commercial fleet.

=== Boeing 737 ===
In 2009, three customized 46 seater Boeing Business Jets (BBJ) (737-7HI) with advanced defensive features similar to the U.S. Air Force One replaced the former ageing Boeing 737-200 aircraft. The three BBJs, named Rajdoot, Rajhans and Rajkamal were procured at a cost of ₹9.34 billion (US$130 million) each - ₹7.34 billion (US$100 million) for the actual aircraft plus an additional ₹2 billion (US$28 million) for Self Protection Suites. These suites include radar warning receivers, missile-approach warning and counter-measure systems. The aircraft has the capability to shoot chaff and flares to deviate radar-guided and heat-seeking missiles off their target path. Other security instruments on board the aircraft are classified.

The BBJs have a four class configuration. For VIPs 1, 2 and 3, an executive enclosure in the aircraft includes an office and a bedroom.

=== Embraer 145 and Legacy 600 ===
On 21 September 2005, four 14 seater Embraer Legacy 600 (also, Embraer 135BJ) and four 20 seater Embraer 145 aircraft were inducted into the squadron to replace the HS-748 Avro transports. Each Embraer 135 is equipped with missile-deflecting systems, modern flight management systems including global positioning system configuration, as well as category II instrument landing system. These aircraft cost the IAF ₹1.4 billion (US$20 million) each.

In August 2025, the IAF contracted a Gurugram-based aviation firm to upgrade its 20 year-old, 14 seater Embraer 135BJ fleet. The planned works will include a full repaint of the aircraft, along with a comprehensive overhaul and refurbishment of both the cockpit and passenger cabin. This will involve replacing internal fittings and panels, polishing all surfaces, and installing new furnishings, upholstery, curtains, window shades, and flooring. While the project timeline is two years, each aircraft will take five months for the process to be completed. The overhaul will be scheduled in such a way that, while one aircraft is undergoing refurbishment, the remaining three will always be available for emergency operations.

=== Mil Mi-17 V-5 ===
The Mil Mi-17 V-5 is currently used to ferry VVIPs and OEPs within the country. The old and ageing Mi-8 helicopters were retired in 2017 and replaced with the newer, more advanced Mi-17 V-5 helicopters.

In February 2010, the UPA-led government had signed a contract worth €556 million for 12 new AgustaWestland AW-101 helicopters for VVIP transport. This deal was scrapped by the NDA-led government in January 2014, on allegations of bribery. In 2014, approval was given by the Ministry of Defence for the "conversion" of six [military] Mi-17 V-5s to VVIP helicopters, to replace the old Mi-8s. The conversion was carried out at the IAF base repair depot (3 BRD), Chandigarh.

On 8 December 2021, an Mi-17 V-5 was lost in an incident in the Nilgiri hills in Tamil Nadu. The helicopter carrying the then Chief of Defence Staff, General Bipin Rawat, his wife and other military personnel crashed near Coonoor while flying from Sulur Air Force Station, Coimbatore to Wellington where the CDS was scheduled to visit the Defence Services Staff College. General Rawat, his wife and all except one of the 14 personnel on board the helicopter were killed. A week later, one of the pilots, the lone survivor of the crash, succumbed to his injuries in hospital.

On 26 October 2026, the Defence Acquisition Council (DAC), chaired by the Defence Minister, approved the procurement of 24 Special Utility Helicopters at a cost of ₹10,000 crore (US$1.1 billion) for the Indian Air Force for serving VVIP transport roles as a replacement for the in-service Mi-17 V-5s. Airbus Helicopters (H725) and Lockheed Martin are expected to be the main contenders.

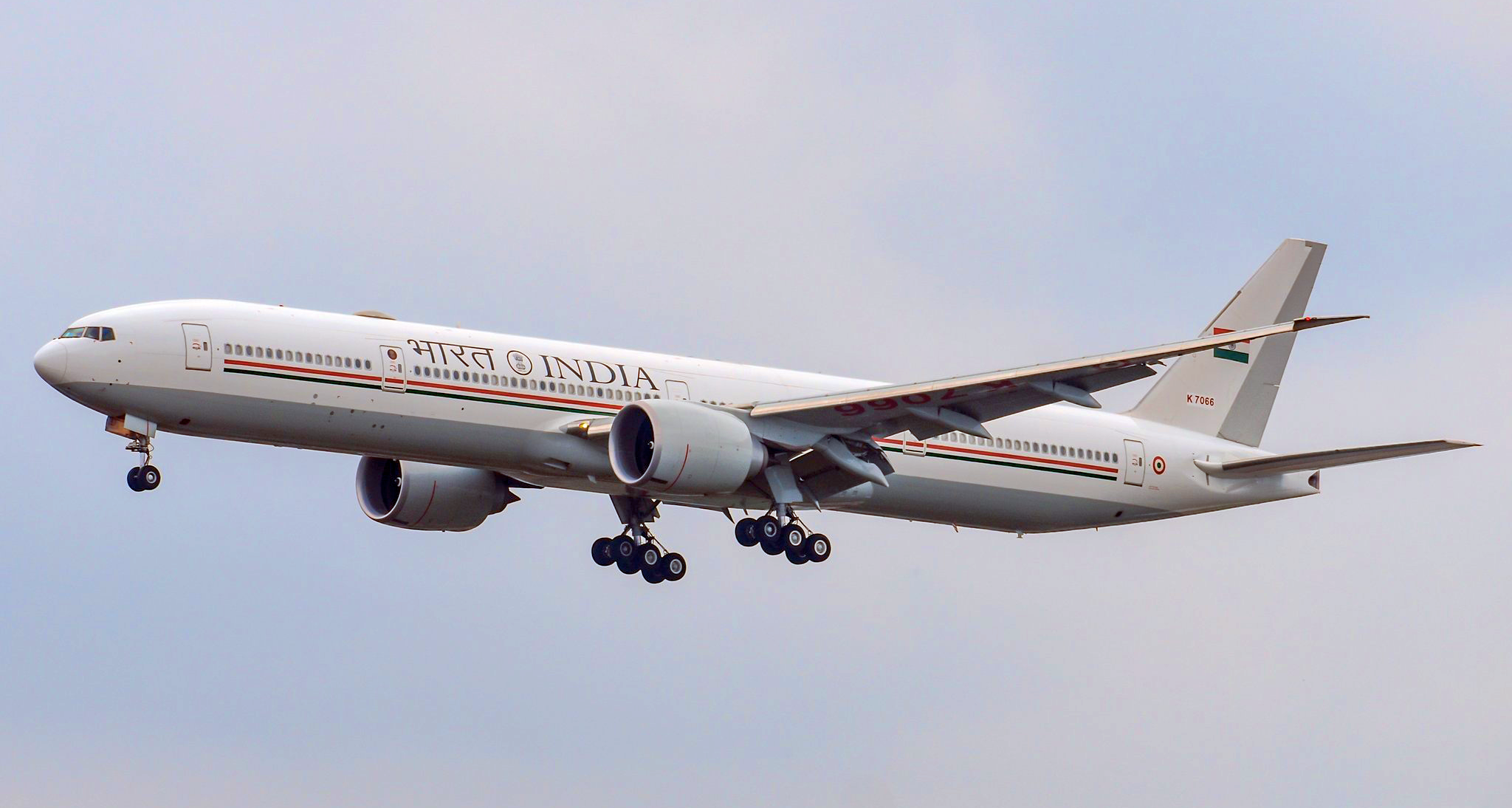
IAF Boeing 777-300ER Special Extra Section Flight

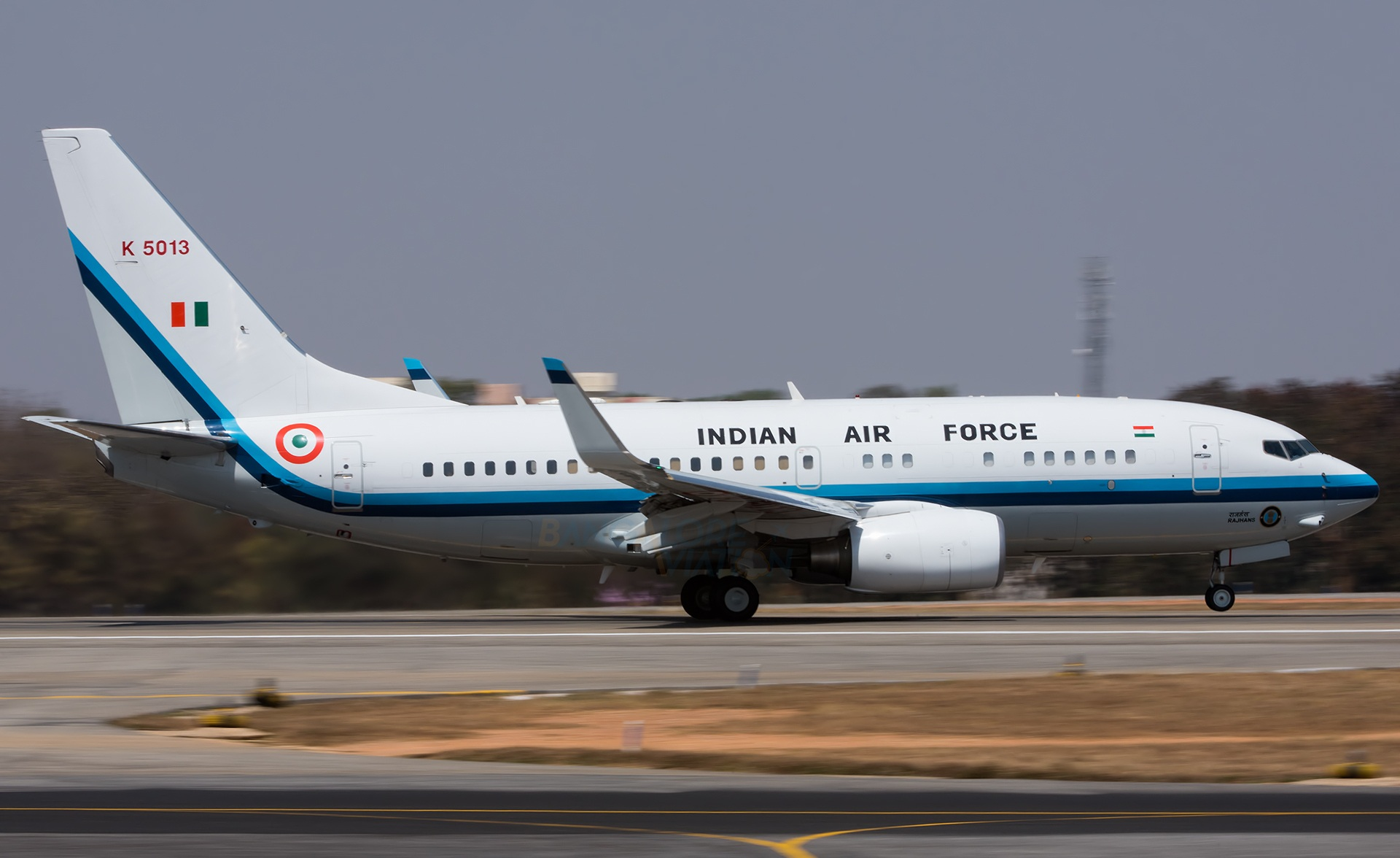
IAF Boeing 737 BBJ 'Rajhans'

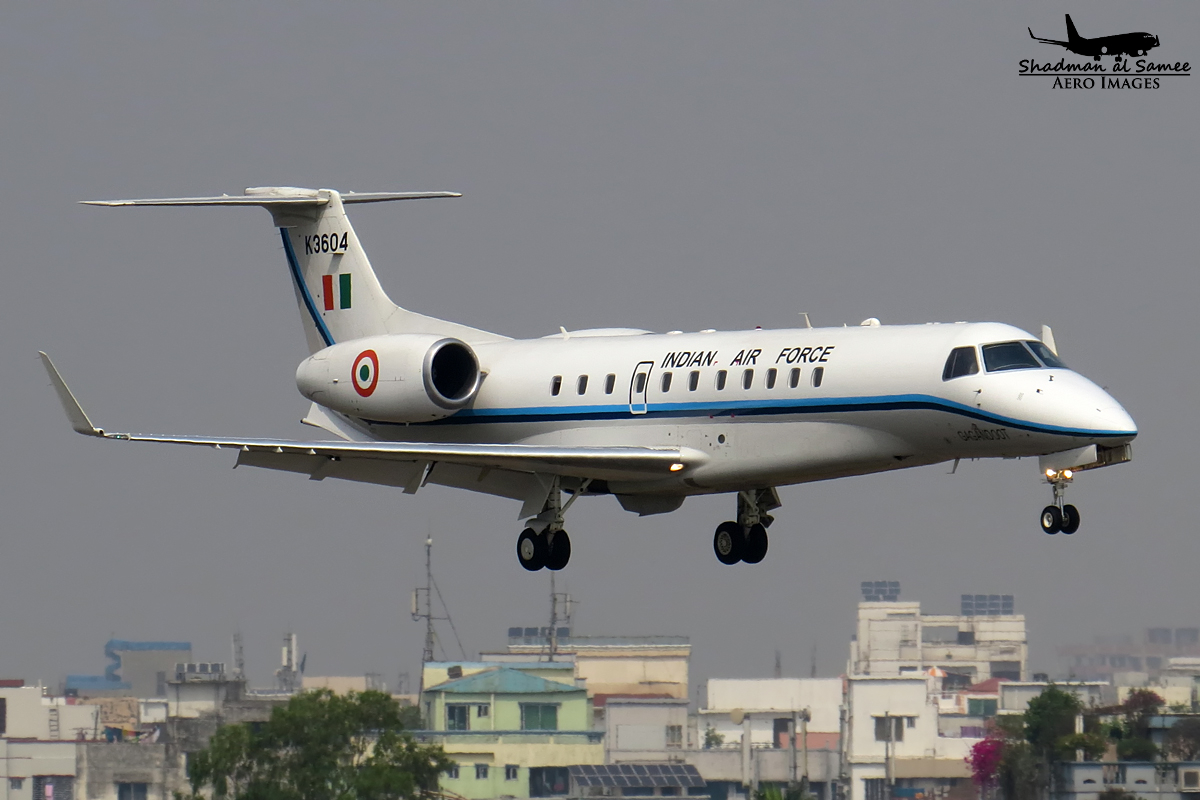
IAF Embraer Legacy 600 (Embraer 135BJ) 'Gagandoot'

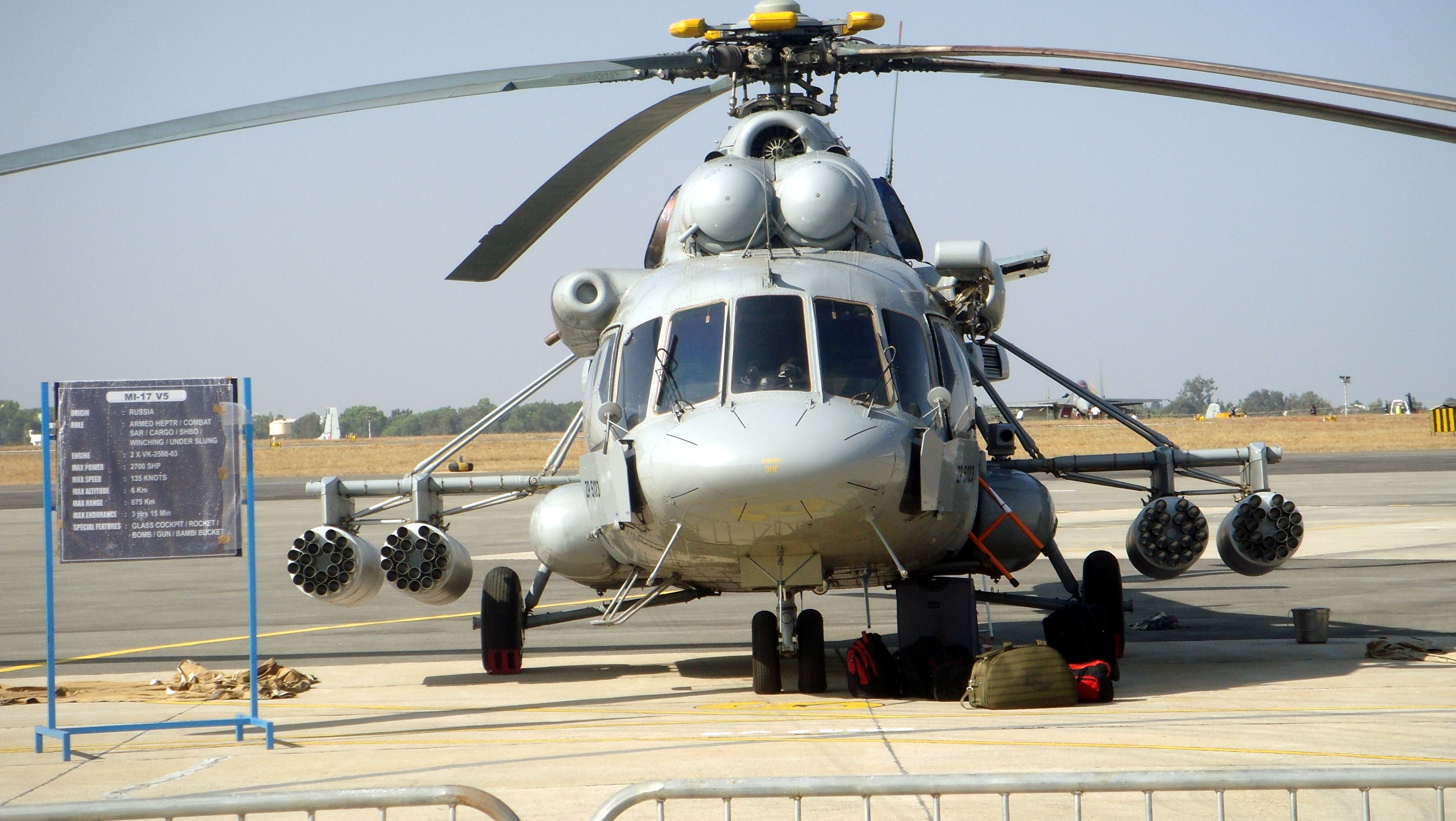
IAF Mil Mi-17 helicopter (combat version)

== Historical fleet ==
- Airspeed Oxford (1947–48)
- North American Harvard (variant of the North American T-6 Texan) (1947–68)
- Douglas DC-3 (1948–67)
- De Havilland Devon (1948–78)
- Ilyushin Il-14 (1955–67)
- Vickers Viscount (1956–62)
- De Havilland Vampire (1956–62)
- Hawker Siddeley HS-748 Avro (1964-2005)
- Tupolev Tu-124 (1966–81)
- Boeing 737-200 (1983-2009)
- Mil Mi-8 (1983-2017)
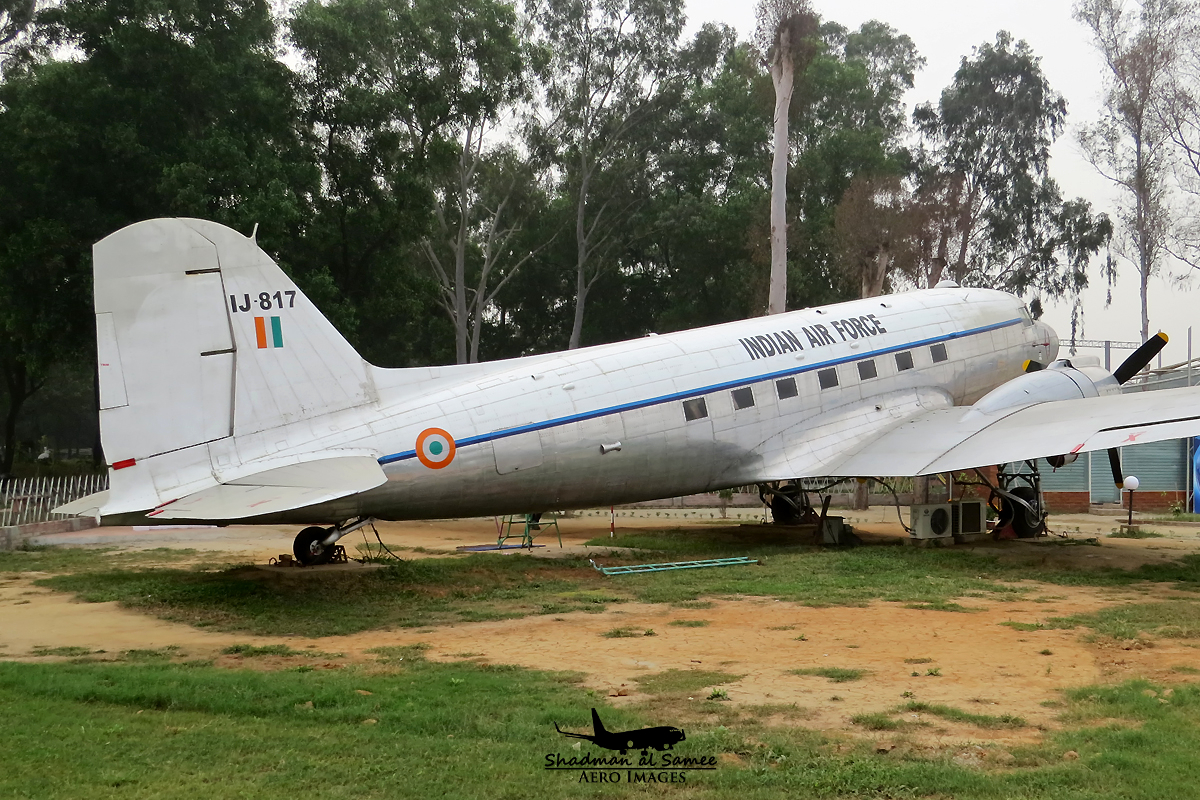
IAF Douglas DC-3 Dakota

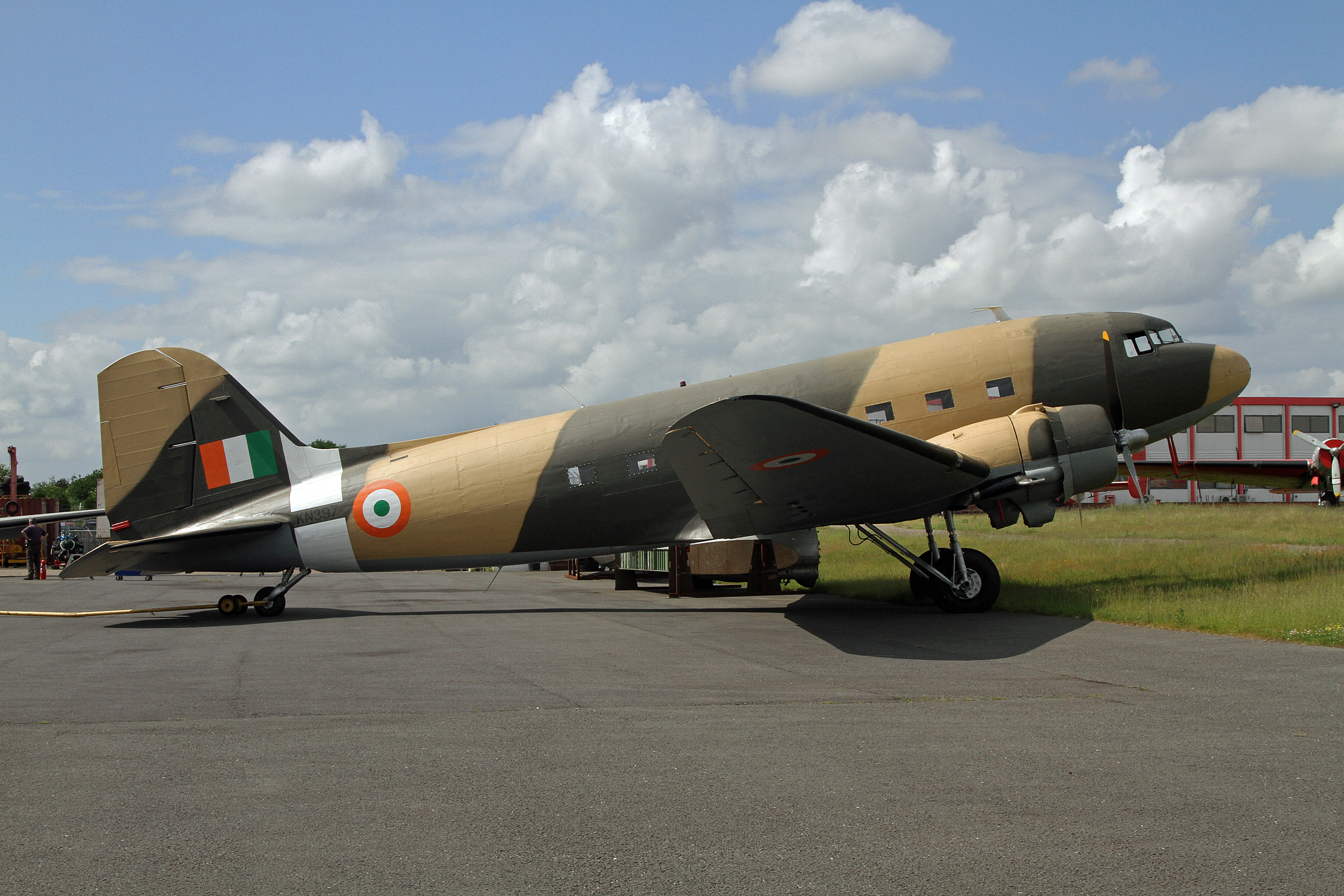
Indian Air Force Historic Flight Douglas DC-3 Dakota

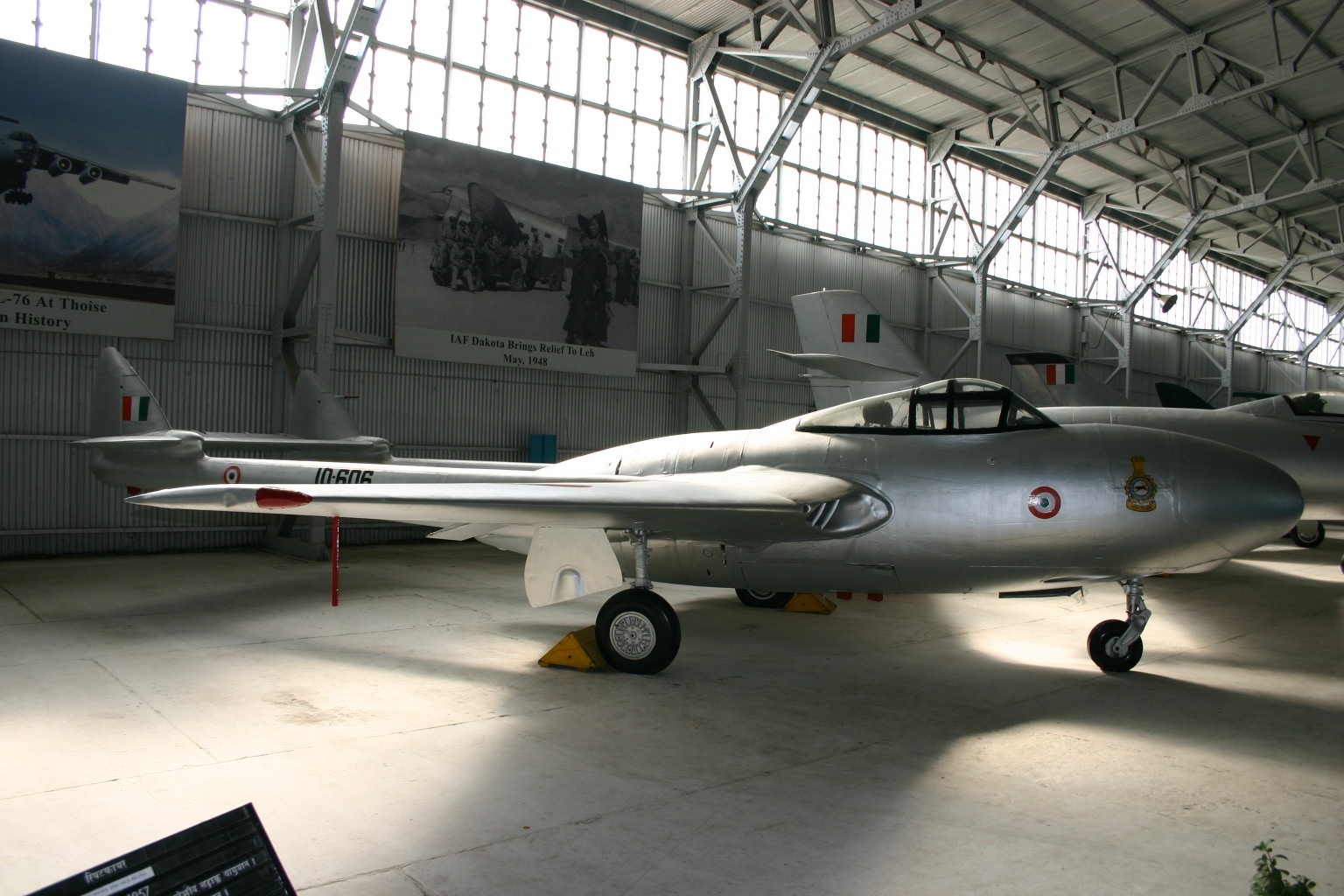
IAF DeHavilland Vampire

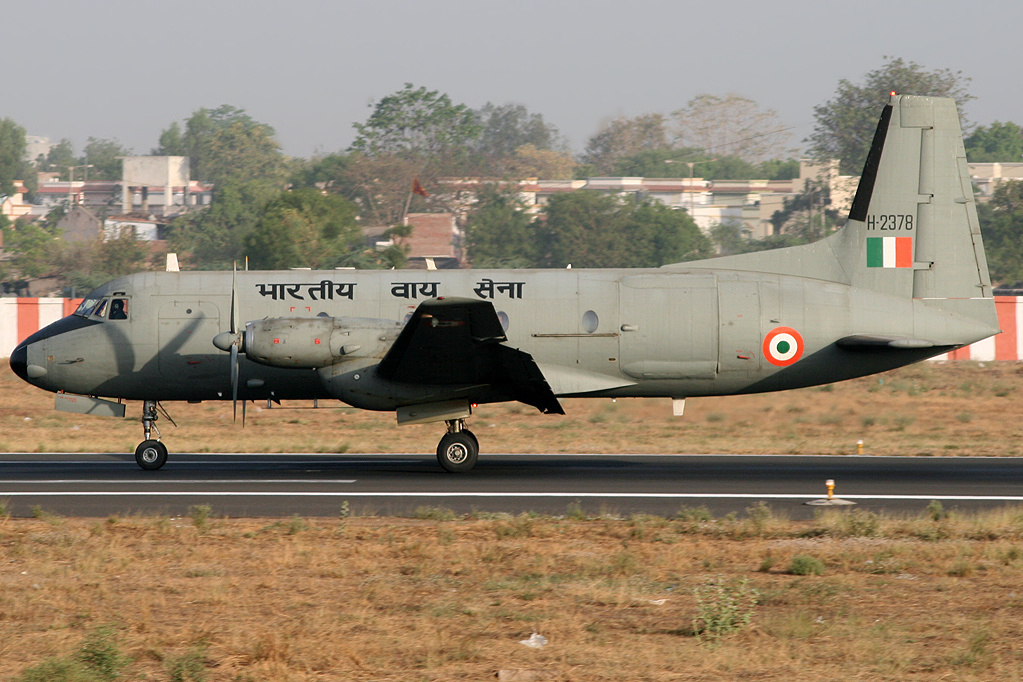
IAF Hawker Siddeley HS-748 Avro

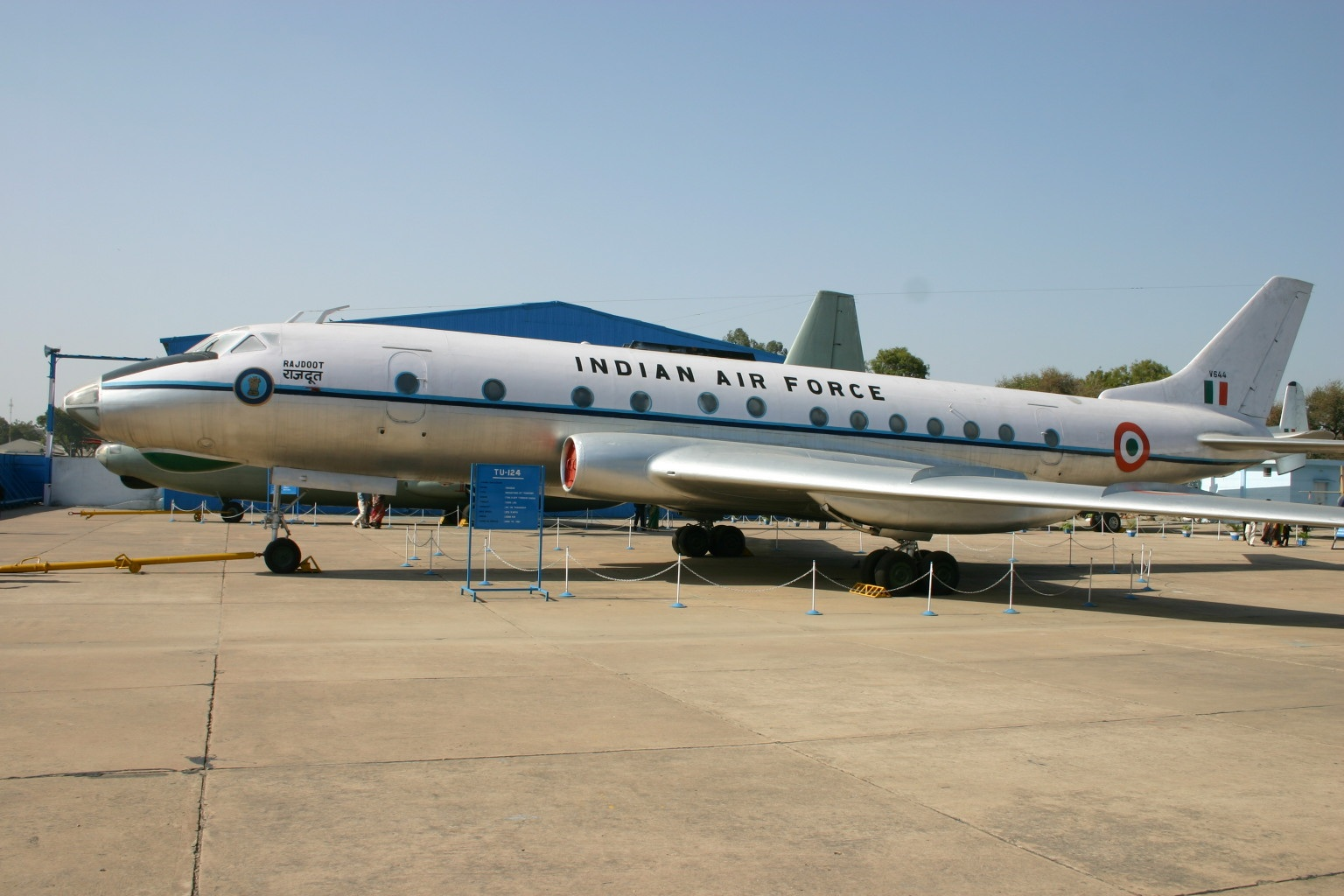
IAF Tupolev Tu-124

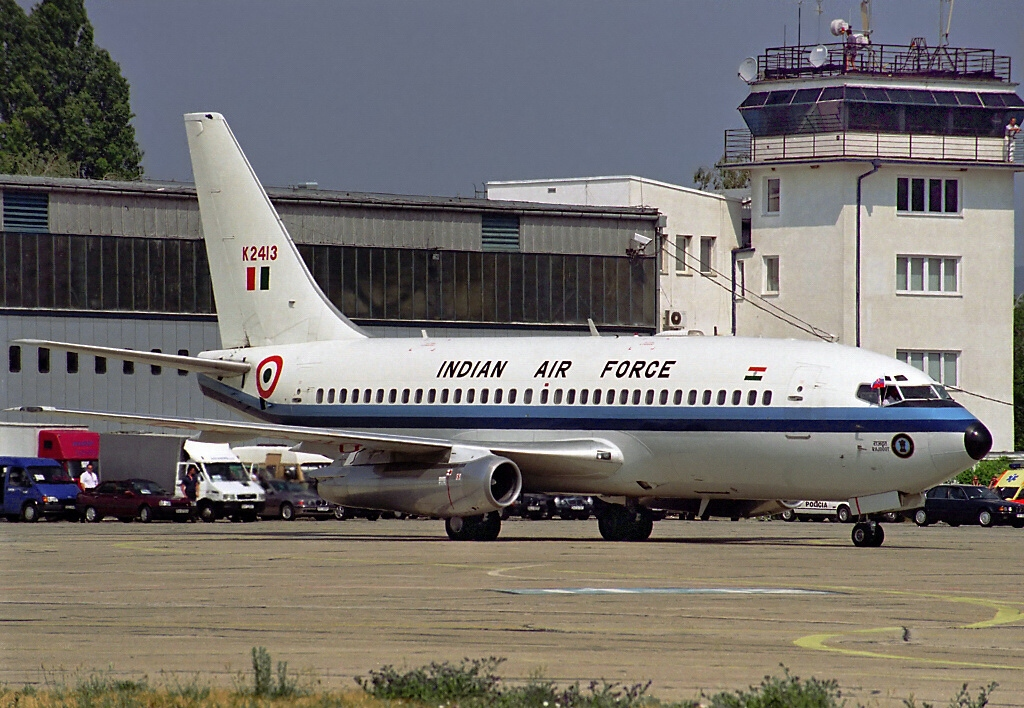
IAF Boeing 737-200 'Rajdoot'

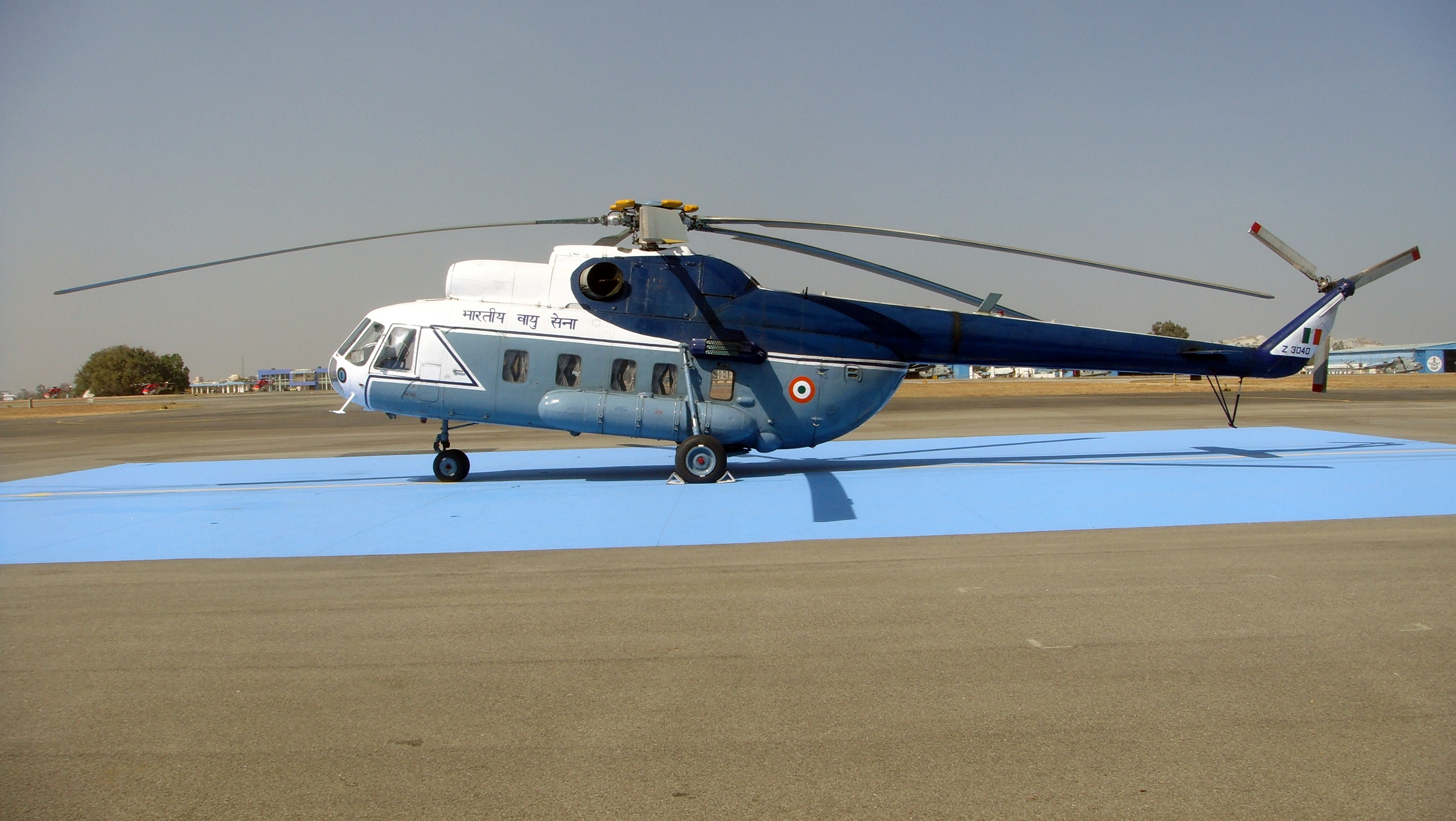
IAF Mil Mi-8 helicopter

== See also ==
- Air India One
- 89th Airlift Wing - United States Air Force
