= Ayesha Dutt =

Indian film actress and producer

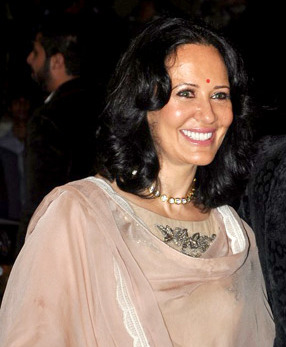
- Dutt at the 60th Filmfare Awards
- Born: 5 June 1960 (age 66)
- Other name: Ayesha Shroff
- Occupations: Model; film producer; actress
- Years active: 1984–2007
- Spouse: Jackie Shroff (m. 1987)
- Children: Tiger Shroff; Krishna Shroff
- Father: Ranjan Dutt

Ayesha Dutt (born 5 June 1960), also known by her married name Ayesha Shroff, is an Indian film producer, actress and former Miss Young India 1980. She is married to Bollywood actor Jackie Shroff and is the mother of Tiger Shroff and Krishna Shroff.

== Early life ==
Ayesha Dutt was born to a Bengali father, Air Vice Marshal Ranjan Dutt, an Indian Air Force officer and Vir Chakra awardee, and Claude Marie Dutt De Cavey, a Belgian Countess.

Ayesha Dutt participated in the Miss Young World contest at Manila.

She acted in a Bollywood film Teri Baahon Mein alongside Mohnish Bahl in 1984.

== Personal life ==
Ayesha Dutt married her longtime boyfriend and Bollywood actor, Jackie Shroff on her birthday on 5 June 1987. She later turned into a film producer. The couple run a media company, Jackie Shroff Entertainment Limited. They jointly owned 10% shares in Sony TV since its launch until 2012 when they sold their stake and ended their 15-year-long association with Sony TV. She has two children, Tiger Shroff (born 1990), a Bollywood actor, and a daughter, Krishna Shroff (born 1993), a film maker and social media personality.

In 2009, Ayesha Dutt had an affair with Sahil Khan when the two started a production company together. The alleged relationship of the two and their business partnership took an ugly turn later in 2014 when she filed a legal case against him.

== Filmography ==
Year	Title	Credited as
1984	Teri Baahon Mein	Actress
2000	Jis Desh Mein Ganga Rehta Hain	Producer
2001	Grahan	Producer
2003	Boom	Producer
2003	Sandhya	Producer
2007	Bombil and Beatrice	Producer
