= Abhishek Singh =

Abhishek Singh may mean:

- Abhishek Singh (politician) (born 1981), Indian politician
- Abhishek Singh (artist) (born 1982), Indian visual artist and graphic novelist
- Abhishek Singh (cricketer) (born 1984), Indian cricketer
