= Abhishek Sharma (disambiguation) =

Abhishek Sharma (born 2000) is an Indian cricketer.

Abhishek Sharma may also refer to:

- Abhishek Sharma (director), Indian film director and writer
- Krushna Abhishek (born Abhishek Sharma, 1983), Indian actor and comedian
