= Peshawar Club =

Members-only club in Peshawar, Pakistan

- پشاور کلب
- PSC
- Interactive map of Peshawar Club
- Full name: Peshawar Services Club
- Former names: Games Club (1863–1899); Peshawar Club (1899–1947); Peshawar Services Club Limited (1947–1993); Peshawar Garrison Services Club (1993–2011); Peshawar Services Club (2011–Present)
- Address: 40-The Mall (Sir Syed Rd), Peshawar Cantonment; Peshawar, Khyber Pakhtunkhwa; Pakistan
- Location: Peshawar Cantonment, Peshawar, Khyber Pakhtunkhwa, Pakistan
- Coordinates: 33.998258°N 71.533085°E
- Operator: Peshawar Services Club
- Type: Gentlemen's club
- Current use: Members-only club and sports/social facilities

Construction
- Opened: 1863
- Years active: 1863–present

Website
- peshawarservicesclub.com

== Introduction ==
Peshawar Services Club (PSC) is a private members' club located in Peshawar, Khyber Pakhtunkhwa, Pakistan. The club provides social, recreational, sporting, dining, and hospitality facilities for its members and their families. Its activities include sports, social gatherings, dining services, and events organized throughout the year.

== History ==
Established in 1863, Peshawar Services Club (PSC) is one of the oldest social and recreational clubs in Pakistan and the Indian subcontinent. In a selected historical comparison, PSC ranks as the 3rd oldest club in the Indian subcontinent and 8th among the 18 historic clubs listed worldwide.

Originally established as the Games Club at No. 40, The Mall, Peshawar, it featured three tennis courts and a polo ground. In 1870, the Vale Hunt Club adopted the premises as its headquarters, and on 3 April 1899, it was officially registered as the Peshawar Club.

Following Partition in 1947, it became Peshawar Services Club Limited. It was renamed Peshawar Garrison Services Club in December 1997 and subsequently Peshawar Services Club in May 2011.

With over 160 years of history, PSC remains one of the region's most historic social and recreational institutions.

== Members ==
Peshawar Services Club offers membership to individuals and eligible family members in accordance with its membership policies. Membership provides access to designated club facilities and services, subject to the applicable rules and regulations. The club also maintains membership categories and identification systems to manage access and facilitate member services.

== List of Presidents ==
Name	Start of Term	End of Term
Lt Col. John Dring	1947	December 1948
Abdul Rashid	March 1950	January 1951
Major General Nazir Ahmed	January 1951	March 1951
Brigadier S. Hismud Din	March 1951	March 1952
M. Ahmed	March 1952	March 1953
Major General H. I. Ahmaed	March 1953	April 1954
Khan Sahib Mir Bashar Khan	April 1954	April 1955
Colonel Monowar Khan Afridi	April 1955	May 1956
Air Commodore Maqbool Rabb	May 1956	December 1956
Major General Adam Khan	December 1956	June 1957
Brigadier Nasir Ahmed	June 1957	September 1957
S. D. Qureshi	September 1957	November 1957
Colonel Safdar Ali	November 1957	June 1958
Kazi Abdul Wahab	June 1958	April 1959
Air Commodore Nur Khan	April 1959	June 1961
Brigadier Masaud Khan	June 1961	August 1962
Nawabzada Sher Afzal Khan	August 1962	August 1963
Air Vice Marshal M. A. Rahman	August 1963	December 1964
Lieutenant General Altaf Qadir	December 1964	June 1966
Masrur Hassan Khan	June 1966	January 1967
Ghulam Sarwar Khan	January 1967	March 1968
Air Marshal Nur Khan	March 1968	March 1969
Brigadier Abdul Latif	March 1969	March 1970
K. S. Mohd Said Khan	March 1970	April 1971
Air Commodore Zafar Mahmood	April 1971	May 1972
Brigadier Khalid Rabbani	May 1972	June 1972
M. M. K. Bangash	June 1972	May 1974
Air Commodore M. R. Mahmood	May 1974	April 1975
Brigadier Mohd Akbar Khan	April 1975	April 1976
S. Agha Khan Baba Khan	April 1976	January 1977
Air Commodore Waheed A. Butt	January 1977	May 1978
Brigadier Abdul Sattar Chaudhry	May 1978	July 1979
Commodore Izzat Awan	July 1979	June 1980
Air Commodore T. H. Merchant	June 1980	June 1981
Brigadier Jan Sardar Gul	June 1981	June 1982
Dil Jan Khan	June 1982	June 1983
Air Commodore S. M. Sibtain	June 1983	July 1984
Brigadier Sardar Khan	July 1984	July 1985
Karim Khan	July 1985	June 1986
Air Commodore S. M. Sibtain	June 1986	June 1986
Brigadier Javad Khan	June 1986	July 1988
Ilyas Ahmed Bilour	July 1988	January 1993
Brigadier Abul Razaq	January 1993	November 1994
Brigadier Mumtaz Ali	November 1994	February 1995
Brigadier Fayyaz Muhammad	February 1995	December 1997
Brigadier Mateen Mohajir	December 1997	April 1998
Brigadier Munzur Hussain	June 1998	April 2000
Brigadier Mazhar-Ul-Haq	May 2000	August 2001
Brigadier Khalid Rabbani	August 2001	July 2003
Brigadier Iftikhar-Ul-Haq	August 2003	July 2005
Brigadier Zia-Ul-Hassan	July 2006	August 2006
Brigadier Tariq Maqsood Malik	July 2006	August 2008
Brigadier Humayun Saleem	August 2008	July 2009
Brigadier Hussain Abbas	August 2009	March 2010
Brigadier Farooq Azam	March 2010	April 2011
Brigadier Farooq Azam	May 2011	June 2012
Brigadier Adnan Asif Jah Shad	July 2012	August 2014
Brigadier Inayat Hussain	August 2014	August 2016
Brigadier Muhammad Aamer Najam	August 2016	June 2018
Brigadier Shakir Ullah Khattak	June 2018	June 2019
Brigadier Syed Muhammad Jawad Tariq	June 2019	June 2020
Brigadier Syed Mudassir Saeed	June 2020	Aug 2022
Brig Muhammad Sajid Mahmood	Aug 2022	Aug 2024
Brig Ali Asghar	Aug 2024	Aug 2025
Brig Mubashar Ahmad Abbasi	Aug 2025	March 2026
Brig Umair Kaleem Butt	March 2025	July 2026
BRIG Abdul Wahab	July 2026	Incumbent

== Sports and Recreational Facilities ==
Peshawar Services Club offers a range of sports, fitness, and recreational facilities for its members. The club's principal sporting amenities include lawn tennis courts, squash courts, badminton facilities, a swimming pool, a gymnasium, and a jogging track. Additional recreational amenities include a card room, a library, and a digital library.

The club's gymnasium is equipped with cardiovascular exercise machines, strength-training equipment, and free weights. Personal trainers are available to assist members with fitness activities, while separate training hours are designated for male and female members.

These facilities form part of the club's broader provision of sporting, recreational, and leisure activities.

== Dining and Food Services ==
Peshawar Services Club provides dining and hospitality services through two distinct facilities: the Food and Beverage (F&B) Section and The Club Cafe.

The Food and Beverage (F&B) Section manages the club's principal dining operations, offering a variety of Pakistani, Chinese, continental, and barbecue cuisine. Its menu includes traditional and regional specialties, alongside bakery products, desserts, and beverages. The section also provides regular and special dining arrangements, including Sunday brunch, hi-tea, buffet dinners, and themed food events. The club maintains a separate dining hall with a seating capacity of approximately 40 guests for private dining and small gatherings.

The Club Cafe, established in 2021, operates as a separate café facility within the club premises. It specializes in Italian-style coffee, sandwiches, American breakfast selections, and other light refreshments. The café provides an informal setting for members and their guests to enjoy coffee, breakfast, and casual dining.

Together, these facilities cater to different dining preferences, with the Food and Beverage Section providing comprehensive restaurant and catering services, while The Club Cafe focuses on café-style dining and refreshments.

== Accommodation and Hospitality ==
Peshawar Services Club provides furnished guest accommodation through three principal room categories: Suite, Deluxe, and Studio.

Suite accommodation comprises two rooms with a double bed, television lounge, seating area, refrigerator, dining table, and attached bathroom. Deluxe rooms include a double bed, television, seating arrangements, refrigerator, and bathroom facilities. Studio rooms are furnished with two single beds and essential accommodation amenities.

The club undertook renovations of its guest accommodation in January 2020 to improve room facilities and service standards.

Additional hospitality services include Wi-Fi access, air conditioning, room service, laundry facilities, parking, and electronic payment options. Accommodation is available for short- and longer-term stays, subject to the club's reservation procedures and applicable policies.

== Events and Activities ==

Peshawar Services Club regularly hosts social, cultural, sporting, and recreational events for its members and participating guests. Its published event records document activities including family festivals, swimming competitions, national commemorations, cultural programmes, musical evenings, and organized dining events.

Among its events in 2026 were the Defence Day Family Festival on 6 September, the PSC Swimming Gala on 29 August, an Independence Day Speech Competition on 14 August, and the closing ceremony of its Summer Boot Camp on 18 July.

The club has also organized tombola nights, cricket match screenings, and seasonal celebrations. These activities contribute to its role as a venue for social interaction and organized recreation.

== Cultural Programmes and Festivals ==
Peshawar Services Club organizes cultural programmes and festivals that highlight regional traditions, food, arts, and community participation.

The club hosted a Cultural and Food Festival on 26 September 2025, followed by the publication of event highlights on 27 September. Its event records also include Bahaar K Rung, held on 26 April 2026, and Soughat – Where Art Meets Craftsmanship, which was announced on 20 May 2025.

Such programmes form part of the club's cultural and recreational calendar and provide opportunities for artistic presentations, exhibitions, and community engagement.

== Sports Tournaments and Competitions ==

Organized sporting activities and competitions form part of Peshawar Services Club's recreational programme.

The club's published records include the Swimming Gala held on 21 September 2025 and the PSC Swimming Gala organised on 29 August 2026. These events reflect its involvement in organized swimming activities and recreational competition.

The club also offers facilities for badminton, squash, and lawn tennis, providing opportunities for participation in individual and group sporting activities.

Through its sporting facilities and scheduled activities, the club supports physical fitness, recreational participation, and sportsmanship among its members.

== Training and Internship Programmes ==

Peshawar Services Club has provided internship opportunities for students and professionals seeking practical experience in an institutional working environment.

The club maintains a dedicated internship programme page on its official website, providing information and an application form for prospective participants. A previously advertised internship application period included a submission deadline of 5 October 2024.

The club has also organized recreational training activities, including a Summer Boot Camp whose closing ceremony took place on 18 July 2026.

These initiatives form part of the club's educational, training, and recreational activities. The availability and scope of individual internship opportunities are determined by the programmes announced by the club.

== Affiliations and Partnerships ==
Peshawar Services Club maintains affiliations with a network of recreational, social, and institutional clubs across Pakistan.

According to its official website, its affiliated institutions include Islamabad Club, Jacaranda Club, Lahore Gymkhana, Defence Club Lahore, Jhelum Club, Multan Garrison Mess, Chenab Club Faisalabad, Quetta Club, Karachi Gymkhana, Karachi Club, and several Defence Authority clubs in Karachi.

Additional affiliated institutions listed by the club include Abbottabad Club, Bannu Club, Dera Ismail Khan Club, Garrison Officer Mess Nowshera, DeSOM Club Lahore, and Gwadar Gymkhana.

These affiliations establish institutional relationships with clubs in different cities across Pakistan. Access to facilities and services at affiliated institutions is subject to the respective clubs' membership regulations, policies, and applicable arrangements.

== See also ==
- Sind Club
- Punjab Club
- List of India's gentlemen's clubs
- Karachi Parsi Institute
- Karachi Gymkhana
- Lahore Gymkhana
- Hindu Gymkhana, Karachi
