= No. 10 Squadron IAF =

No. 10 Squadron
- Active: 20 February 1944–31 March 2019
- Country: Republic of India
- Branch: Royal Indian Air Force (1944–50); Indian Air Force (1950–2019)
- Role: CAS; Interdiction; Reconnaissance
- Garrison/HQ: Jodhpur AFS
- Nickname: "Winged Daggers"
- Mottos: Yudhay Krutnischay; Into war with determination

Commanders
- Notable commanders: Bob Doe; Haider Raza; M. A. Rahman; C. G. Devashar

No. 10 Squadron (Daggers) was a fighter squadron equipped with MiG-27. It was based at Jodhpur Air Force Station. The squadron was number-plate in March 2019.

== History ==
No. 10 Squadron, Indian Air Force, was formed in 1944 and was the last squadron of the Royal Indian Air Force to be created during World War II.

The squadron became entirely Indianized with the appointment of Squadron Leader Haider Raza as Commanding Officer on 5 January 1946.

In 1954, No. 10 Squadron transitioned to a night-fighting role with the induction of the Vampire NF54 aircraft. Stationed at Palam Air Force Station, the squadron was tasked with providing nocturnal air defence for the capital region. The NF54, equipped with AI Mk10 radar, required specialised training for pilots and navigators, leading to the development of unique operational protocols. The squadron maintained this role until its decommissioning in April 1964.

The squadron was presented with its President's Standard on 18 March 1985, at Jodhpur.

=== Assignments ===
- Burma campaign
- Indo-Pakistani War of 1947–1948
- Indo-Pakistani War of 1965
- Bangladesh Liberation War of 1971

== Aircraft ==
Aircraft	From	To	Air Base
Pre-Independence (1944–47)
Hawker Hurricane	May 1944	August 1945	Lahore
Harvard 2B	July 1944	September 1947	
Spitfire VIII	August 1945	January 1947	AFS Yelahanka
Post-Independence (1947–Present)
Hawker Tempest	January 1947	January 1954	AFS Ambala
Vampire FB52	January 1954	January 1955	AFS Palam
Vampire NF54	September 1955	May 1964	AFS Palam
Douglas C-47	July 1958	July 1964	AFS Palam
HAL HF-24 Marut	April 1967	1971	AFS Pune
HAL HF-24 Marut	December 1971	August 1980	AFS Uttarlai
MiG-23	January 1981	December 1993	AFS Jodhpur
MiG-27	January 1994	31 March 2019	AFS Jodhpur
