= Maqbool Rabb =

Pakistani Air Commodore (1914-1996)

- مقبول رب

3rd Chief of Staff Pakistan Air Force
- In office 21 June 1957 – 24 March 1959
- Commander-in-Chief: Air Vice Marshal McDonald (1955-1957); Air Marshal Asghar Khan (1957-1965)
- Preceded by: Haider Raza
- Succeeded by: M. A. Rahman

President Peshawar Services Club Limited
- In office May 1956 – December 1956
- Preceded by: Monowar Khan Afridi

5th Commandant, RPAF College
- In office June 1954 – November 1954
- Succeeded by: B. K. Dass

Personal details
- Born: 12 November 1914
- Died: 10 February 1996 (aged 81)
- Children: 1
- Education: Aligarh Muslim University; Joint Services Staff College (UK); Imperial Defence College

Military service
- Branch/service: Royal Indian Air Force (1940-1947); Pakistan Air Force (1947-1966)
- Years of service: 1940-1966
- Rank: Air Commodore
- Commands: RPAF College; Station Drigh Road; No. 2 Squadron RIAF
- Battles/wars: World War II; Burma campaign

Maqbool Rabb (Note: Urdu: مقبول رب) (12 November 1914 — 10 February 1996) was a Pakistani one-star rank air officer and among the pioneer officers of the Pakistan Air Force. He served as its fifth chief of staff from 1957 to 1959. He later served as Pakistan's Ambassador to Turkey and Greece from 1962 to 1966 and High Commissioner to Lebanon from 1967 to 1973.

== Early life ==
Maqbool Rabb was born on 12 November 1914. He was educated at the Aligarh Muslim University and was the Captain of the University tennis team.

He joined the Aeronautical Training Centre in Delhi in 1935 and qualified for a civil pilots 'B' license in 1937. He worked as a commercial pilot and a flying instructor at the Civil Aviation Department.

== Personal life ==
He had a son named Saeed Rabb.

== Service years ==
=== Royal Indian Air Force (1940-1947) ===
Maqbool Rabb was commissioned into the Royal Indian Air Force on 15 February 1940. He served as the Officer Commanding of No. 2 Sqn, from 9 April 1946 to 6 March 1947. He was subsequently appointed Commanding Officer of the Elementary Flying Training School in Jodhpur and served until 30 June 1947.

=== Pakistan Air Force (1947-1966) ===
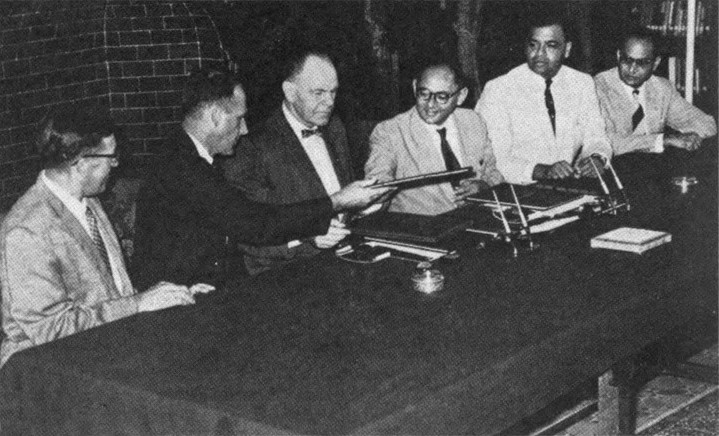
Exchange of the instruments of ratification for the Pakistan–United States Double Taxation Convention in Karachi, 21 May 1959. From left: Commercial Attaché Hubert M. Curry, Counsellor for Economic Affairs Thomas C.M. Robinson, U.S. Ambassador James M. Langley, Foreign Minister Manzur Qadir, Chief of Protocol Maqbool Rabb, and Joint Secretary Quamrul Islam.

After the Partition of British India in August 1947, Maqbool Rabb transferred to the Royal Pakistan Air Force (RPAF). Gp Capt M. K. Janjua, Wg Cdr Haider Raza, and Wg Cdr Maqbool Rabb were the only RPAF officers serving at RPAF Headquarters in Peshawar. At the time, Wg Cdr Maqbool Rabb held the appointment of Training Staff Officer. In January 1949, Gp Capt Rabb was appointed Air Officer-in-Charge Administration.

Group Captain Rabb was the Air Adviser to the High Commission of Pakistan in London in 1950. He was appointed Commander of Station Drigh Road in May 1951 and served until July 1953. He served as the fifth Commandant of the RPAF College from June 1954 to November 1954.

In June 1955, Minister of Defence General Ayub Khan asked his pilot Wing Commander S.M. "Lanky" Ahmad about the most suitable Pakistani officer to become the next Commander-in-Chief of the Royal Pakistan Air Force. He responded that as the defence minister, Ayub was in the best position to judge. However, Ayub insisted on hearing his personal opinion. Lanky referred to the RPAF seniority list and mentioned three likely candidates: Air Commodores Haider Raza, Maqbool Rabb, and Asghar Khan. He strongly recommended Asghar, who was still actively flying and "very popular". He also noted that Prime Minister Bogra had already recommended Raza for the position, and the file was awaiting the approval of Governor-General Malik Ghulam Muhammad at the Defence Ministry.

He was one of three Pakistanis, including General Musa Khan, selected to attend the Imperial Defence College beginning at January 1956.

Air Commodore Maqbool Rabb was appointed as Assistant Chief of Air Staff (Admin) in January 1957. He was appointed Chief of Staff of the Air Force on 21 June 1957. Flight described him as "remarkably genial" in its February 1958 publication. He served until 24 March 1959. In his 1959 book Rakaposhi, British mountaineer Mike Banks recalled meeting acting Commander-in-Chief Air Commodore Maqbool Rabb, during the British–Pakistani joint forces Himalayan expedition to Rakaposhi and described Maqbool Rabb "as charming as he was helpful and indeed could not do too much for us". He further wrote that through Rabb's offices the expedition's entire 2.5 tons of stores and equipment were flown from Rawalpindi to Gilgit by a special Bristol Freighter.

Air Commodore Maqbool Rabb was subsequently appointed as the Chief of Protocol and served until late October 1961. He then served as the Ambassador of Pakistan (resident in Ankara) to Turkey and Greece from 1962 to 1966. He retired from the Air Force on 12 November 1966.

== Diplomatic career ==
He served as High Commissioner to Lebanon (resident in Beirut) from 1967 to 1973, with concurrent accreditation to Cyprus and Laos.

== Death ==
He died on 10 February 1996.
