= Erlic Pinto =

Indian Air Force officer

Air Vice Marshal Erlic Wilmot Pinto PVSM
- Born: 29 June 1921
- Died: 22 November 1963 (aged 42); Poonch, Jammu and Kashmir, India
- Military career
- Allegiance: United Kingdom (1940–1942); British India (1942–1947); India (from 1947)
- Branch: Royal Air Force; Royal Indian Air Force; Indian Air Force
- Service years: 1940–1963
- Rank: Air Vice Marshal
- Commands: Western Air Command; Air Force Station Palam; No. 4 Squadron
- Conflicts: World War II; Annexation of Goa
- Awards: Param Vishisht Seva Medal; Mentioned in dispatches (2)

Air Vice Marshal Erlic Wilmot Pinto, PVSM (29 June 1921 – 22 November 1963) was an Air officer in the Indian Air Force. He was the Air Officer Commanding-in-Chief (AOC-in-C) Western Air Command when he was killed in the 1963 Poonch Indian Air Force helicopter crash. He served in the IAF from 1940 until his death in 1963. He was the theatre air commander commanding the air operations during the Indian annexation of Goa.

== Early life and education ==
Erlic Pinto was born on 29 June 1921 into the Pinto do Rosario family of Porvorim, Portuguese Goa. His brothers Fausto and Norman also served in the Indian Armed Forces. Fausto joined the Indian Navy and retired as a rear admiral while Norman joined the Indian Army and retired as a captain. He attended the St. Paul's School, Belgaum and the St. Xavier's College, Bombay.

== Military career ==
=== World War II ===
In August 1940 Pinto was seconded to the UK along with 23 other trained Indian pilots. He served with the No. 12 Squadron RAF from 1940 to 1942. In 1942, he returned to India and joined the oldest squadron of the IAF, No. 1 Squadron IAF, then commanded by Squadron Leader Henry Runganadhan. After a short stint, he was transferred to No. 7 Squadron IAF. In October 1943, he was promoted to the acting rank of flight lieutenant and took command of a flight. The commander of the other flight in the squadron was Flt Lt Pratap Chandra Lal. The squadron was equipped with the Vultee A-31 Vengeance dive bombers and supported the Chindits. The squadron also helped in relieving the Siege of Imphal.

For his service in Burma, Pinto was mentioned in dispatches in December 1944. After a two-year stint in No. 7 Squadron, he served briefly with No. 9 Squadron IAF. He was promoted to the acting rank of squadron leader and took command of No. 4 Squadron IAF in August 1945. After the war, Pinto was absorbed into the permanent cadre of the IAF. In July 1946, he took charge of the Initial Training Wing (ITW) (later Air Force Administrative College) at Coimbatore. The ITW was based at Pune and Pinto served as the first commandant of the college in Coimbatore, where it has remained since.

=== Post-Independence ===
On 15 August 1947, with the partition of India, a new Air Headquarters of the Dominion of India was formed. Pinto was promoted to the acting rank of wing commander and served in the Directorate of Organisation at Air HQ. In December, the RIAF took over Air Force Station Palam from the Royal Air Force. Pinto took over the airbase thus becoming the first RIAF officer to take command. The airbase was a part of the No. 1 Operational Group commanded by Air Commodore Mehar Singh and participated in the Indo-Pakistani War of 1947. For the command of the airbase during the war, Pinto was mentioned in dispatches. He was promoted to substantive wing commander on 15 August 1948.

In November 1948, Pinto was promoted to the acting rank of group captain and took command of the Advanced Training School (AFS) at Ambala. The AFS was rechristened No. 1 Air Force Academy in July 1949. In February 1950, Pinto was appointed the second air advisor to the High Commissioner of India to the United Kingdom at India House, London. The High Commissioner throughout his tenure was V. K. Krishna Menon, who later became the minister of defence. Pinto was selected to attend the RAF Staff College, Andover in April 1952. After completing the year-long staff course, he was promoted to substantive group captain.

Pinto served as the Director of Policy and Plans at Air HQ from 1955 to 1958. In May 1958, he was promoted to the acting rank of air commodore and took over as the air officer-in-charge administration (AOA). As the AOA, he served as a principal staff officer to the CAS Air Marshal Subroto Mukerjee. In November 1959, Pinto was promoted to the acting rank of air vice marshal and appointed air officer commanding-in-chief (AOC-in-C) Operational Command. He took over the command from Air Vice Marshal Arjan Singh. In December 1960, he took the salute at the passing out parade at the Air Force Station Hyderabad.

=== Annexation of Goa ===
In December 1961, the Indian Armed Forces launched Operation Vijay against Portuguese India. The overall commander of the operation was Lieutenant General Jayanto Nath Chaudhuri, the general officer commanding-in-chief Southern Command. Pinto, as the AOC-in-C Operational Command was the theatre air commander. He had forces in the airbases in Pune and Belgaum for the operation. These consisted of a section of four Dassault Mystères, a squadron of Toofanis and a signal unit under him. This was the first real action seen by the Mysteres.

The mandate handed to Pinto was listed out as follows:

- The destruction of Goa's lone airfield in Dabolim, without causing damage to the terminal building and other airport facilities.
- Destruction of the wireless station at Bambolim, Goa.
- Denial of airfields at Daman and Diu, which were, however, not to be attacked without prior permission.
- Support to advancing ground troops.

The air forces under Pinto bombed the Diu Island. The ammunition, petroleum dumps and water reservoirs were destroyed by the bombers. The Portuguese strong-points of Fort-De-Cova, Secho and Fort-De-Mar were heavily also damaged.

== Death and legacy ==
On 22 November 1963, Pinto was killed when his helicopter crashed en route to Poonch. In a great loss to the Indian Armed Forces, the crash claimed six distinguished officers. The officers who were on the helicopter apart from Pinto were:

- Lieutenant General Daulet Singh, general officer commanding-in-chief Western Command
- Lieutenant General Bikram Singh, general officer commanding XV Corps
- Major General N K D Nanavati, general officer commanding 25 Infantry Division
- Brigadier S R Oberoi, commander 93 Infantry Brigade
- Flight Lieutenant S S Sodhi, Pilot

The news of the air crash came as a shock to the nation. Multiple distinguished visitors paid their respects, including Prime Minister Jawaharlal Nehru and the Chief of the Air Staff Aspy Engineer. A black-bordered extraordinary Gazette of India was issued on 23 November. Pinto was laid to rest with full military honours. The funeral procession started at the Pinto residence on Akbar Road. The coffin was placed on a gun carriage and moved on to the cemetery on Prithviraj Road. The Pallbearers were 10 officers of the rank of air vice marshal, including future Chiefs Arjan Singh, Pratap Chandra Lal, Om Prakash Mehra. He was awarded the Param Vishisht Seva Medal posthumously on 26 January 1964.

A memorial has been built at the site of the air crash, commemorating the names of the victims. The Indian Army organises an annual event to pay homage to them. An 'Akhand Path' is also organised by the people of Poonch and surrounding villages, as a mark of their love and affection towards the departed souls, every year to commemorate the tragic accident.

== Bibliography ==
- Lal, P.C. (1986), My years with the IAF, Lancer Publishers, ISBN 8170620082
- Sapru, Somnath (2014), Combat Lore: Indian Air Force 1930-1945, K W Publishers Pvt Ltd, ISBN 978-9383649259
- Pandey, Hemant Kumar; Singh, Manish Raj (2017), India's Major Military & Rescue Operations, Horizon Books, ISBN 978-9386369390
- Vaz, J Clement (1997), Profiles of Eminent Goans: Past and Present, Concept Publishing Co, ISBN 978-8170226192

Military offices
| New title Office re-designated | Air Officer Commanding-in-Chief Western Air Command; 1963–1963 | Succeeded by Pratap Chandra Lal |
| Preceded by Arjan Singh | Air Officer Commanding-in-Chief Operational Command; 1959–1963 | Office re-designated |
| New title New office | Station Commander Air Force Station Palam; 1947–1948 | Succeeded by Maurice Barker |
| Preceded by Jagdev Chandra | Commanding officer No. 7 Squadron IAF; 1944–1945 | Succeeded by Jagdev Chandra |
