= No. 4 Squadron IAF =

No. 4 Squadron Oorials
- Insignia of the No.4 Squadron
- Active: Since 1 February 1942; 84 years ago
- Country: Republic of India
- Branch: Indian Air Force
- Role: Air superiority Precision Strike; Interdiction
- Garrison/HQ: Jodhpur Air Force Station
- Nickname: "Oorials"
- Mottos: Maan Par Jaan (Death over Dishonour)
- Engagements: Burma Campaign; Indo-Pakistani War of 1965; Indo-Pakistani War of 1971

Commanders
- Notable commanders: M. K. Janjua; Erlic Pinto; Jagdev Chandra; Minoo Merwan Engineer; Maurice Barker; Idris Hasan Latif

Aircraft flown
- Fighter: Su-30 MKI

No. 4 Squadron IAF also known as The Oorials Squadron is a fighter squadron of the Indian Air Force (IAF) equipped with the Su-30 MKI, based at Jodhpur Air Force Station in Jodhpur in, Rajasthan, India. Since its establishment during the South-East Asian theatre of World War II, No. 4 Squadron remains the only fighter squadron other than No. 3 Squadron IAF and No. 7 Squadron IAF to remain continuously in existence in the service of India.

== Crest ==
The squadron adopted the 'Oorial head' as its emblem in December 1944 shortly before the Supreme Allied Commander of South East Asia Command Lord Louis Mountbatten visited the squadron. The squadron crest consists of an Oorial head with the Ashoka on top and the squadron Motto 'Honour unto death' written below. When the squadron was formed at Peshawar the Afghan tribals used to conduct regular fights amongst the local mountain sheep known as the Oorial; a subspecies of the Urial, with a red coat. The Oorial is a wild horned mountain sheep, with a very lengthened sense of smell and sight. They have the ability to climb the steepest hillsides with remarkable ease, and are even wary and alert with significant strength and endurance. This animal has the ability of being a ferocious fighter that continues the fight to death rather than lose face and honour by turning away.

During World War II, No. 4 Squadron adopted a live sheep as its squadron mascot — a quirky tradition that began in Kohat and continued through various deployments, including the Burma campaign. The mascot became a symbol of esprit de corps, with wool-shearing ceremonies and mess antics forming a unique part of squadron folklore.

== History ==
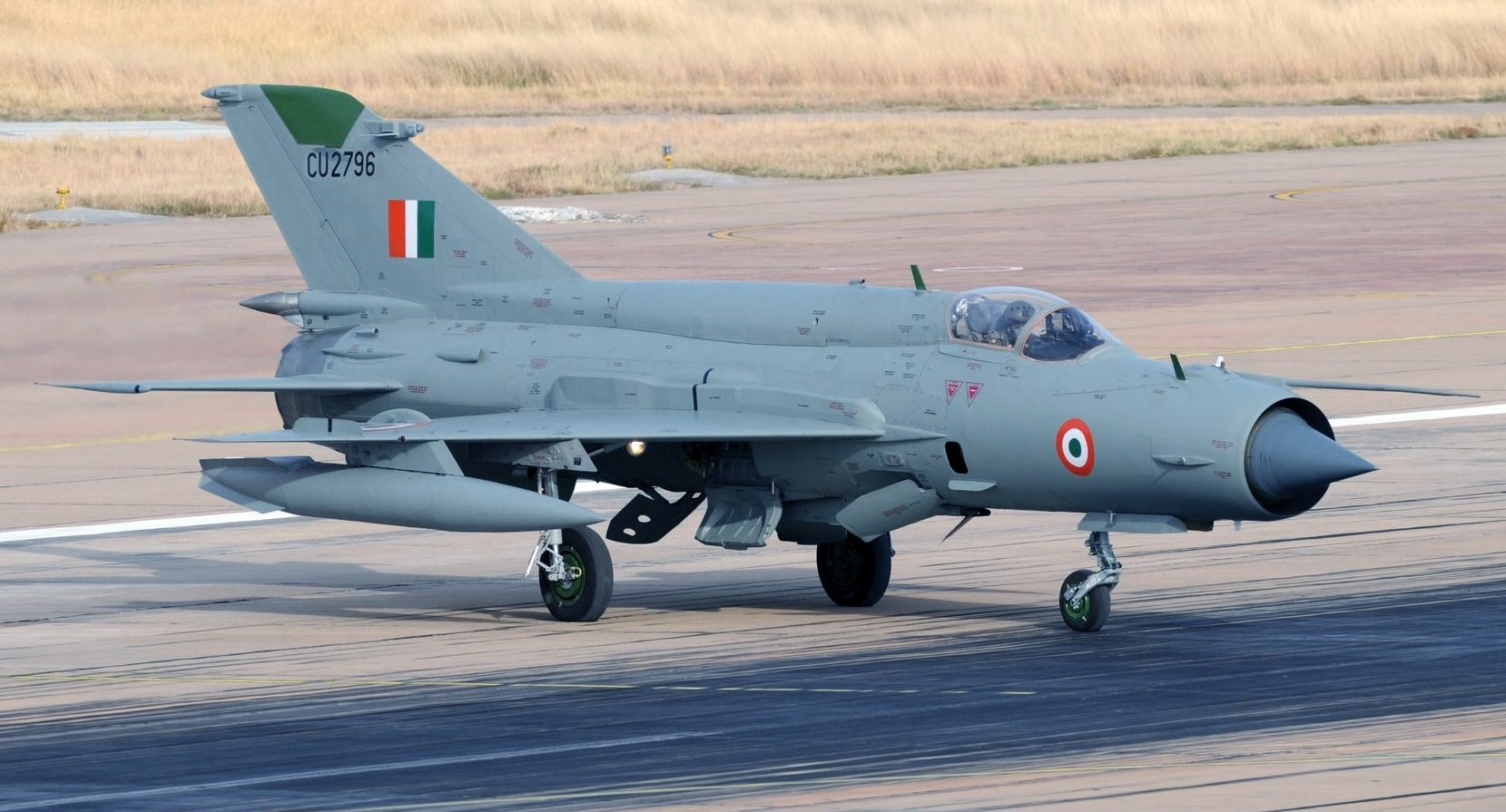
Indian Air Force MiG-21 Bison

No. 4 Squadron of the Indian Air Force was first formed at Peshawar on 1 February 1942. Squadron Leader Habib Ullah 'Bulbul' Khan was its first commanding officer. The squadron was first equipped with Westland Lysander aircraft. The Second World War was in its third year, and Japanese forces were advancing towards India's eastern frontiers in the South-East Asian theatre of World War II. Within a few days, the squadron moved to Kohat where it would conduct missions over rebel-held areas of the North-West Frontier Province (NWFP).

In 1942 the squadron moved on a detachment to Hyderabad, Sindh, to operate in support of the army during operations against the Hurs. The Indian Army was then dealing with the insurrection instigated by Faqir Ipi.

During 1942, the squadron also operated Lysander detachments from Miranshah, a forward base in the North-West Frontier Province, for action against insurgent Pashtuns in North Waziristan. During this period the squadron operated its aircraft as bombers, besides carrying out its army air cooperation role, tactical reconnaissance and mail dropping missions.

In June 1942, the squadron moved to the RAF station at Risalpur, near Rawalpindi, for converting onto the Hawker Hurricane fighter bombers. The conversion training was completed by August 1942 and No. 4 Squadron moved to Phaphamau to collect its branch new Hurricane IIC aircraft.

In September 1943 the squadron moved from Phaphamau to Bhopal for air-to-air armament training. It was a disastrous move, as out of the 12 Hurricanes that took off, 3 crashed due to bad weather.

On completion of armament training, the squadron moved to Sulur in November 1943 to practice for eventual operations in Burma. In February 1944, the squadron moved to Ranchi to carry out special low flying and ground attack training before moving to the front for its operational tour to Burma.

In March 1944, the squadron moved to Fenny Airfield for operations against the Japanese occupation of Burma. The role of the squadron was to provide close air support to the British Fourteenth Army campaign. It was from Fenny Airfield that the squadron carried out its first operational sorties by providing fighter escort for Dakota transport aircraft, engaged in supply dropping missions for the Northern Combat Area Command in northern Burma.

From August 1944 to January 1945, the squadron was based at Cox's Bazar to relieve No. 6 Squadron RAF and carried out close air support, interdiction and tactical reconnaissance operations.

As the British Fourteenth Army pushed the Japanese forces southwards and moved towards Rangoon, No. 4 Squadron was constantly on the move and kept moving from one advanced landing ground to another.

In December 1944, the Third Arakan Offensive began. The objective being to capture the Maya peninsula Akyab, Ramree island and to contain the Japanese in the Arkan and prevent them from crossing the Arakan Yoma and interfering with the advance of the British Fourteenth Army. No. 4 Squadron operated in direct support of the land forces and bombed Japanese strongpoints at Haparabyin and Ratheduang. During the landing of the Indian troops at Kangow, the squadron laid a smoke screen on the beach to enable safe landing of the troops. In recognition of the services rendered, the squadron's personnel were awarded one DSO, four DFCs and one MBE. It is at this time that the squadron adopted the Oorial head as its emblem.

In April 1945, No. 4 Squadron was transferred back to India, ferrying back 9 Hurricanes for conversion onto Spitfire aircraft. By end of 14 May Spitfire Mk VIIIs were received and conversion training commenced in June. The squadron took part in the Victory over Japan Day parade at Madras by carrying out a flypast.

In August 1945, the squadron was intimated of the possibility of the Oorials moving to Japan as part of the British Commonwealth Occupation Force. This was a singular honour for the Royal Indian Air Force and for No. 4 Squadron in particular. Short take off and landing procedures were practiced in preparation for the move to Japan as it was envisaged that the aircraft would be flown off the aircraft carrier onto onshore airfields. The Spitfire had pneumatically operated flaps which could be lowered fully for landing or raised fully up. The squadron devised a method of getting 15 degrees of flaps by inserting wooden wedges.

On 8 April 1946, HMS Vengeance sailed with 22 aircraft of No. 4 Squadron, berthed at Singapore for refueling and set course for Iwakuni, a port of Kyushu island. The aircraft carrier finally arrived at Air Station Iwakuni and was anchored midstream. The decision taken earlier to fly the aircraft off the carrier was changed since excellent facilities were provided for off-loading and transporting the aircraft.

The squadron was given a temporary base at Air Station Iwakuni until the rest of the personnel arrived. Shortly thereafter, the squadron moved to its permanent location at Miho on Sloustin Island. From here the squadron undertook various flying tasks which were mainly maritime patrol over the sea to ensure there was no subversive activity or smuggling. The stay at Miho was an interesting one and a lot of extracurricular functions were undertaken.

The flight commanders Flight Lieutenant Nur Khan and Flight Lieutenant Shirpurkar evolved a pattern of formation flying depicting the letters "IAF". This being the first time such letters were seen in the sky. There were occasional exercises carried out to display the air strength to the local populations while large formations were flown over the big cities.

The squadron returned to India in February 1947 and was located at Kanpur. They were here when the country achieved independence. In October 1947, the squadron was re-equipped with Hawker Tempest IIs and became the training squadron for the Indian Air Force.

The squadron phased the Mig-21 from its service on 31 October 2023. The squadron is now being equipped with Su-30MKI.

=== Assignments ===
- Burma Campaign
- Indo-Pakistani War of 1965
- Indo-Pakistani War of 1971

== Aircraft ==
Aircraft	From	To	Air Base
Pre-Independence (1942–47)
Westland Lysander	March 1942	July 1943	Peshawar
Hawker Hurricane Mk IIC	October 1943	May 1945	Risalpur
Spitfire VIII	July 1945	March 1946	Cox's Bazar
Post-Independence (1947–Present)
Hawker Tempest II	November 1947	October 1955	AFS Lohegaon
Vampire FB52	October 1955	February 1957	AFS Halwara
Dassault Ouragan	February 1958	1960	AFS Palam
Dassault Ouragan	1960	February 1966	AFS Tezpur
MiG-21FL	February 1966	February 1980	AFS Tezpur
MiG-21bis	February 1980	February 2004	AFS Uttarlai
MiG-21 Bison	February 2004	31 October 2023	AFS Uttarlai
Su-30 MKI	31 October 2023	Present	AFS Jodhpur
