= Haider Raza =

Pakistani Air Force Chief of Staff (1916–1998)

Air Vice Marshal Haider Raza
- حیدر رضا

Air attaché to Embassy of Pakistan, Washington, D.C.
- In office 9 July 1957 – December 1962
- President: Iskandar Mirza (1956-1958); Ayub Khan (1958-1969)

4th Chief of Staff Pakistan Air Force
- In office 20 December 1954 – 20 June 1957
- Commander-in-Chief: Leslie William Cannon (1951-1955); Arthur McDonald (1955-57)
- Preceded by: Douglas Lloyd Amlot
- Succeeded by: Maqbool Rabb

Officer Commanding No. 10 Squadron RIAF
- In office 5 January 1946 – 22 August 1946
- Succeeded by: M. A. Rahman

Personal details
- Born: Syed Haider Raza; 23 September 1916 Bihar, British India
- Died: 27 January 1998 (aged 81) Lothian, Maryland, USA
- Resting place: St. James' Parish (Lothian, Maryland)
- Citizenship: British India (1916-1947); Pakistan (1947); United States (1966)
- Spouse: Irene (m. 1943; died 2013)
- Children: 3
- Relatives: M. K. Janjua (brother-in-law)
- Education: RAF Staff College, Andover; Imperial Defence College

Military service
- Branch/service: Royal Indian Air Force (1940-1947); Pakistan Air Force (1947-1962)
- Years of service: 1940-1962
- Rank: Air Vice Marshal
- Commands: No. 10 Squadron RIAF
- Battles/wars: World War II; Burma campaign; Japanese invasion of Burma; Waziristan rebellion (1948–1954)
- Awards: Mentioned in Dispatches (1945)

Haider "Victor" Raza (Note: Urdu: حیدر رضا) (23 September 1916 – 27 January 1998) was a two-star rank Air Vice Marshal and a pioneer officer of the Pakistan Air Force. He served as its first native and fourth chief of staff from 1954 to 1957. He was the first air attaché at the Embassy of Pakistan, Washington, D.C., serving from 1957 to 1962.

== Early life ==
Syed Haider Raza was born on 23 September 1916 in Chapra, Bihar to a Muslim family. He was the second-eldest of eleven children, five brothers and six sisters. His older brother was Syed Nadir Raza. Their parents were Syed Mustafa Raza (1888–1950) and Mary (Lyng) Raza (1890–1962), an Englishwoman. Syed Mustafa Raza was a barrister.

== Personal life ==
Flight Lieutenant Raza married Irene Mary (Tiny) at the Sacred Heart Cathedral, New Delhi in March 1943. She was the younger daughter of A. Isar, Additional District Magistrate of Lahore. They had three sons: Afzal Anthony Raza, Haider Raymond Raza, and Mark Raza. Irene died in 2013.

His sister, Tahira married his colleague Air Commodore M. K. Janjua. They met after the Partition of British India in 1947, when Tahira traveled to Pakistan to visit her brother Haider and his wife during a holiday.

== Service years ==
=== Royal Indian Air Force ===
Haider Raza was commissioned into the Royal Indian Air Force on 15 February 1940.

During a landing attempt on 10 February 1943, Flying Officer Raza was caught in a crosswind while piloting his Hawker Hurricane Mk I, causing it to swing off course. Unable to correct the aircraft, it ran off the runway into soft soil, leading to the collapse of the undercarriage.

No. 10 Sqn RIAF became entirely Indianized with the appointment of Squadron Leader Raza as Commanding Officer on 5 January 1946.

Prior to the Partition of British India in 1947, he served as the Deputy President on the Services Selection Board in Meerut.

=== Pakistan Air Force ===
After the Partition of British India on 14 August 1947, the Royal Pakistan Air Force (RPAF) was formed on 15 August. Squadron Leader Raza opted for the RPAF, where he was the second most senior officer. He was promoted to Wing Commander and appointed as Senior Air Staff Intelligence Officer at Air Headquarters.

In 1948, he was promoted to Group Captain and became the Senior Air Officer's Staff at PAF Station Peshawar. From 22 June to 8 July, he led operations against the Faqir of Ipi, forcing him to declare a ceasefire. The operation included a total of 60 sorties (approximately 40 hours total). He attended the RAF Staff College, Andover in 1950.

By March 1951, he was serving as Air Officer Commanding No. 1 Group. At the time, the RPAF was organised into two groups: No. 1 Group Headquarters for Operations based in Peshawar and No. 2 Group Headquarters for Maintenance, located at Drigh Road.

He was selected to attend the 1954 course of the Imperial Defence College which began in January. In April 1954, Asghar Khan and Raza were promoted to Air Commodores and on 20 December 1954, he succeeded Air Commodore Amlot, becoming the first native Chief of Staff of the RPAF.

In June 1955, Minister of Defence General Ayub Khan, asked his pilot Wing Commander S.M. Lanky Ahmad about the most suitable Pakistani officer to become the next Commander-in-Chief of the Pakistan Air Force. He responded that as the defence minister, Ayub was in the best position to judge. However, Ayub insisted on hearing his personal opinion. Lanky referred to the RPAF seniority list and mentioned three likely candidates: Air Commodores Haider Raza, Maqbool Rabb, and Asghar Khan. He strongly recommended Asghar, who was still actively flying and "very popular". He also noted that Prime Minister Bogra had already recommended Raza for the position, and the file was awaiting the approval of Governor-General Malik Ghulam Muhammad at the Defence Ministry.

On 9 July 1957, Air Commodore Raza began his tenure as an air attaché to the Embassy of Pakistan, Washington, D.C. From 11–21 November 1958, he attended and graduated the 10-day Air Transportation Institute course sponsored by the American University School of Business Administration.

== Later life ==
He became a consultant to aerospace industries in 1964. He was employed as a security officer by Georgetown University in 1966.

== Death ==
He died on 27 January 1998. He expressed his wish to be buried adjacent to his close friend, US Army Captain Harold E. MacKnight, who served with the Judge Advocate General's Corps, in the cemetery of St. James' Parish (Lothian, Maryland).

== Awards and decorations ==
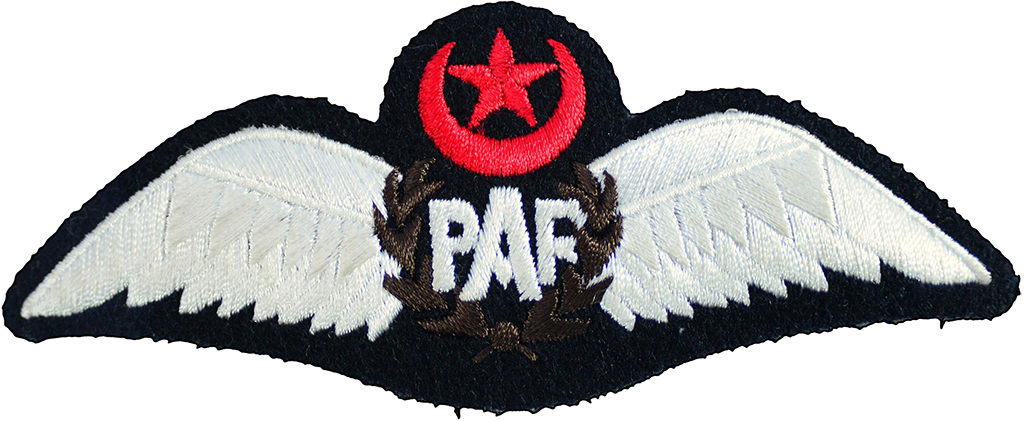

PAF GD(P) Badge RED
Tamgha-e-Qayam-e-Jamhuria (Republic Commemoration Medal); 1956	Burma Star	War Medal 1939–1945 Mentioned in dispatches

== Notes ==
Military offices
Preceded by Douglas Lloyd Amlot	Chief of Staff; 1954–1957	Succeeded by Maqbool Rabb
