= Minoo Merwan Engineer =

Indian Air Force officer (1921–1971)

Air Marshal M M Engineer PVSM, MVC, DFC
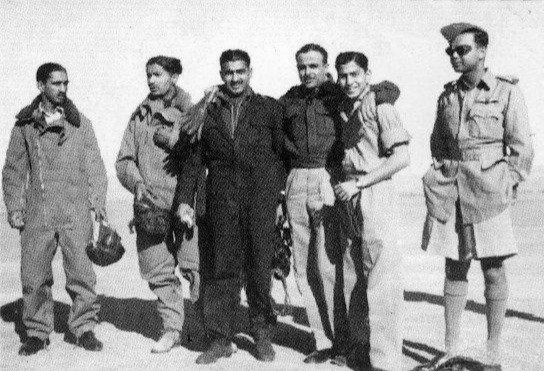
- From left: Nur Khan, Asghar Khan, Abdur Rahim Khan, Om Prakash Mehra, Minoo Merwan, and an unidentified officer, circa 1944.
- Born: Minoo Merwan Engineer; 1 December 1921
- Died: 31 December 1997 (aged 76)
- Relatives: Aspy Engineer (brother)
- Military career
- Allegiance: British India (1940–1947); India (1947–1973)
- Branch: Royal Indian Air Force; Indian Air Force
- Service years: 1940–1973
- Rank: Air Marshal
- Service number: 1614 F(P)
- Commands: Western Air Command; Eastern Air Command; Air Force Station Lohegaon; Air Force Station Srinagar; No.4 Squadron; No. 8 Squadron
- Conflicts: World War II; Burma campaign; Arakan campaign; Indo-Pakistani War of 1947; Indo-Pakistani War of 1965; Indo-Pakistani War of 1971
- Awards: Padma Bhushan; Param Vishisht Seva Medal; Maha Vir Chakra; Distinguished Flying Cross

Air Marshal Minoo Merwan Engineer, PVSM, MVC, DFC (1 December 1921 – 31 December 1997) was a former Air Officer in the Indian Air Force. He is one of the most decorated officers in the Indian Air Force, with the third-highest civil decoration - the Padma Bhushan, two gallantry awards - the Maha Vir Chakra and the Distinguished Flying Cross, and the highest peace-time distinguished service award - the Param Vishisht Seva Medal.

His elder brother, Air Marshal Aspy Engineer served as the 4th Chief of the Air Staff.

== Early life ==
Engineer was born Aspy Merwan Irani on 1 December 1921 in Lahore, Punjab Province, British India to Meherwan Irani and Maneckbai. Meherwan was a Divisional Engineer for the North Western Railway,. His interest in mechanics led his friends to rename him Engineer. He was the sixth amongst eight siblings - two girls and six boys. His brothers, Aspy, Jungoo and Ronnie, also joined the Indian Air Force, while another brother, Homi, joined the Indian Army. Aspy, Minoo and Ronnie were recipients of the DFC, a unique feat where three brothers were decorated with gallantry awards.

== Military career ==
=== Early career ===
Engineer joined the Indian Air Force in 1940, being commissioned on 1 August. He was the third Engineer brother to join the Air Force, after his elder brothers Aspy and Jehangir (Jangoo). During World War II, he served in Burma as a part of No. 3 Squadron IAF. He was awarded the DFC for his part in the Arakan operations. On 30 November 1945, Engineer was promoted to the acting rank of Squadron Leader and appointed commanding officer of No. 8 Squadron IAF.

After the war, on 1 November 1946, he was appointed commanding officer of No. 4 Squadron IAF. The squadron relocated to Miko, Japan as part of the occupation forces. Engineer led the squadron in the relocation and operations in Japan.

=== Post-Independence ===
In March 1948, Engineer took command of Air Force Station Srinagar. As Station Commander at Srinagar, he was responsible for all air force operations in Jammu and Kashmir. For this operation, he was awarded the Maha Vir Chakra, the second-highest war-time gallantry award.

The citation for the Maha Vir Chakra reads as follows:

Gazette Notification: 2Pres/50, 26-1-50

Operation: 1948 Effective Date of Award: 06 November 1948

CITATION

WING COMMANDER MINOO MERWAN ENGINEER, DFC

(1614) GD(P)

Wing Commander Engineer was in charge of the Kashmir operations for nearly a year. Under his able guidance and leadership the enemy has been hit hard and effectively on a number occasions. e.g. KISHEN GANGA BRIDGE, SKARDU AND GILGIT besides the normal close support sorties. The most effective support by the IAF to our land forces in the capture of GURAIS was largely attributable to the planning and drive shown by this officer in personally directing the air operations. Throughout he has set a fine example of leadership.

After the war, in 1949, he was selected to attend the RAF Staff College, Andover. After completing the staff course, he returned to India and was appointed Senior Air Staff Officer (SASO) of the Training Command in Bangalore. On 1 Oct 1954, he was appointed Station Commander of Lohegaon Air Force Station in Pune. He then commanded the newly formed 2 Tactical Air Support Group and 2 Tactical Air Centre at Mumbai and Pune. On 15 April 1959, he was appointed SASO of the Eastern Air Command.

During the Sino-Indian War in 1962, he was appointed Air Officer Commanding (AOC) of the No. 1 Operational Group based at Tezpur. For his services in the Eastern sector, he was awarded the Param Vishisht Seva Medal.

On 5 August 1963, Engineer was promoted to the rank of Air Vice Marshal and appointed Air Officer Commanding-in-Chief Eastern Air Command. After a little over an year, he moved to Air HQ in October 1964 as Deputy Chief of the Air Staff (DCAS). On 1 March 1968, the appointment of DCAS was upgraded to the rank of Air Marshal and Engineer was promoted to the rank.

==== Indo-Pakistani War of 1971 ====
At the time of Indo-Pakistani War of 1971, he was Air Officer Commanding-in-Chief of Western Air Command. For his part in the war, Engineer was awarded the Padma Bhushan for his leadership and services.

== See also ==
- Aspy Engineer

Military offices
Preceded by Shivdev Singh	Air Officer Commanding-in-Chief Western Air Command; 1969–1973	Succeeded by Hrushikesh Moolgavkar
Preceded by Ramaswamy Rajaram	Deputy Chief of the Air Staff; 1964–1969	Succeeded by Om Prakash Mehra
Preceded by Ramaswamy Rajaram	Air Officer Commanding-in-Chief Eastern Air Command; 1963–1964	Succeeded by Y V Malse
