= Bob Doe =

British flying ace (1920–2010)

Robert Francis Thomas Doe
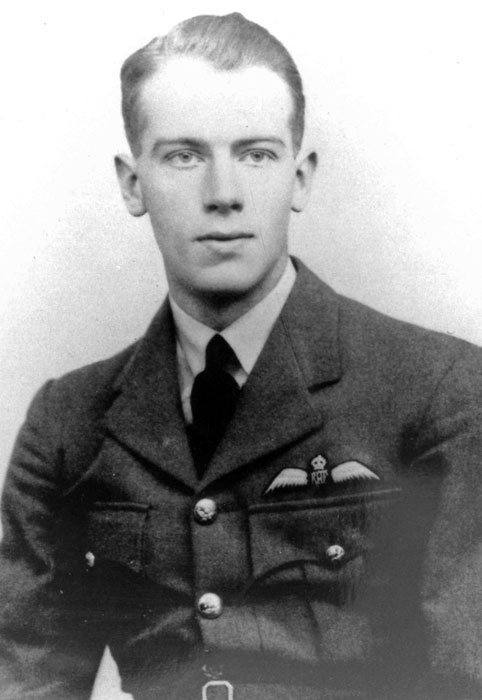
- Bob Doe, during World War II
- Born: 10 March 1920; Reigate, Surrey
- Died: 21 February 2010 (aged 89)
- Military career
- Allegiance: United Kingdom
- Branch: Royal Air Force
- Service years: 1939–1966
- Rank: Wing Commander
- Commands: No. 10 Squadron IAF (1943–45)
- Conflicts: Second World War: Battle of Britain; Burma Campaign
- Awards: Distinguished Service Order; Distinguished Flying Cross & Bar

Robert Francis Thomas Doe, DSO, DFC & Bar (10 March 1920 – 21 February 2010) was a British fighter pilot and flying ace of the Second World War. He flew with the Royal Air Force during the Battle of Britain, and was seconded to the Indian Air Force during the Burma campaign.

== Early life and education ==
Robert Francis Thomas Doe, affectionately known as Bobbie, was born in Reigate, Surrey, on 10 March 1920, to James Doe, a gardener, and his wife Linda, a cook. He started school at age seven years, relatively late, probably as a result of suffering from rickets and a family move to Walton-on-the-Hill. At age 12 years, he left the local church of England school and joined Leatherhead Central School. In 1936, after leaving school, he started work as an office boy for the News of the World. Doe joined the Royal Air Force Volunteer Reserve (RAFVR) in March 1938 and made his first solo flight on 16 June 1938.

== Second World War ==
After applying for a short service commission, Doe joined the Royal Air Force in April 1939. Doe trained with 15 E&RFTS (Elementary & Reserve Flying Training School) at RAF Redhill, Surrey and combat training with 6 Flying Training School at RAF Little Rissington, in Gloucestershire.

Doe was posted on 6 November 1939 to No. 234 Squadron, a Spitfire Squadron at RAF Leconfield alongside Australian Pat Hughes, who would later become an ace. Doe served with No. 234 squadron for most of the Battle of Britain. Doe claimed his first victory on 15 August 1940 when he shot down two Messerschmitt Bf 110s followed by a Messerschmitt Bf 109 and a Dornier Do 18 on 16 August, a Bf 109 destroyed (of JG 52) and another Bf 109 damaged on 18 August, a half-share of a KG 54 Junkers Ju 88 on 21 August and a Bf 109 shot down on 26 August 1940. In September, he added to his tally with No. 234 Squadron with three Bf 110s on 4 September, a shared JG 53 Bf 109 on 5 September, three damaged Dornier Do 17s and a Bf 109 shot down on 6 September, and a Heinkel He 111 destroyed on 7 September.

On 27 September 1940 Doe was posted to No. 238 Squadron, flying Hurricanes from RAF Middle Wallop in Wiltshire, claiming his first victory for the squadron on 30 September by shooting down a KG 55 He 111. In October, Doe shot down a Bf 110 on 1 October and a Ju 88 on 7 October, the last of his 14 and 2 shared aerial victories of the battle and of the war.

On 10 October, in combat over Warmwell, Dorset with some Bf 109s at 12:00, his plane was critically damaged and he was wounded in the leg and shoulder. Doe bailed out, landing on Brownsea Island while his Hawker Hurricane crashed near Corfe Castle viaduct on what is now part of the Swanage Railway. Admitted to Poole Hospital on 22 October 1940, Doe was awarded the Distinguished Flying Cross and received a Bar a month later on 26 November. Doe rejoined No. 238 Squadron in December 1940.

In January 1941, while flying a night sortie, the oil in the oil cooler of his aircraft froze. As a result of his engine seizing he landed heavily at Warmwell on the snow-covered runway, breaking his harness and smashing his face against the reflector sight, almost severing his nose and breaking his arm. Doe was taken to Park Prewett Hospital where he underwent 22 operations by pioneering New Zealand plastic surgeon Harold Gillies. (After the war he was invited to join the Guinea Pig Club.)

On 15 May 1941 he was posted as a Flight Commander to No. 66 Squadron and then joined No. 130 Squadron on 18 August. The series of operations in a two-month period and the need to bring through fresh pilots who could be trained by experienced hands, meant Doe's career as a front line fighter pilot was over for the time being. On 22 October 1941 Doe was posted to No. 57 Operational Training Unit as an instructor. On 9 June 1943 Doe went to the Fighter Leaders School at RAF Milfield and then joined No. 118 Squadron at RAF Coltishall in July. In August 1943 he joined No. 613 Squadron.

In October 1943 Doe was posted to Burma as the activities on the Western Front changed from defence to attack in preparation for Operation Overlord and the invasion of Normandy; while in the East, the Japanese Army was still advancing on key British Empire assets, including India.

In December 1943 Doe was tasked with forming No. 10 Squadron of the Indian Air Force, commanding it throughout the Burma Campaign until April 1945 when he joined the Indian Army Staff College in Quetta and then from August the planning staff at Delhi. On 2 October 1945, Doe received the Distinguished Service Order for his leadership of No. 10 Squadron.

== Later life ==
In September 1946, Doe returned to the UK, where he held several staff positions. He commanded No. 32 squadron in Egypt in 1952, and retired on 1 April 1966 with the rank of wing commander.

After retirement, Doe opened a garage business. He also wrote his autobiography Bob Doe – Fighter Pilot.

== Death ==
Doe died on 21 February 2010, aged 89.

== Quotations ==
We do not want to be remembered as heroes, we ask only to be remembered for what we did ... that's all.

— W/C Robert "Bob" Doe British 234 & 238 Squadrons Fighter Command

If you believe in yourself and believe in what you are doing then you are twice as strong as if you don't. That is what I believe and I certainly believed in my right to defend my land.

— Wing Commander Bob Doe, RAF pilot (in National Geographic)

I wasn't fighting for King and Country. I was fighting for my Mum. I just didn't want them over here. I didn't think it was right..."

— Wing Commander Bob Doe, RAF pilot (in BBC)

== Combat record ==
Source: Shores & Williams, Aces High, pp. 223–4

Chronicle of aerial victories
Date	Service	Flying	Kills	Probables	Notes
15 August 1940	Royal Air Force		1.5 * Messerschmitt Bf 110		
16 August 1940	Royal Air Force		1 * Messerschmitt Bf 109	1 * Dornier Do 18	
18 August 1940	Royal Air Force		1 * Messerschmitt Bf 109		
21 August 1940	Royal Air Force		0.5 * Junkers Ju 88		
26 August 1940	Royal Air Force		1 * Messerschmitt Bf 109		
4 September 1940	Royal Air Force		3 * Messerschmitt Bf 110		
5 September 1940	Royal Air Force		1 * Messerschmitt Bf 109		
6 September 1940	Royal Air Force		1 * Messerschmitt Bf 109		
7 September 1940	Royal Air Force		1 * Heinkel He 111		
30 September 1940	Royal Air Force		1 * Heinkel He 111		
1 October 1940	Royal Air Force		1 * Messerschmitt Bf 110		
7 October 1940	Royal Air Force		1 * Junkers Ju 88		
TOTALS			14 kills, 2 shared	1 probable, 5 damaged	

== Bibliography ==
- Doe, Helen (2015). Fighter Pilot: The Life of Battle of Britain Ace Bob Doe. Stroud, Gloucestershire: Amberley Publishing Limited. ISBN 978-1-4456-6012-7.
