= Bikram Singh (general, born 1911) =

Indian Army lieutenant general

Lieutenant General Bikram Singh PVSM
- Born: 4 July 1911
- Died: 22 November 1963 (aged 52)
- Military career
- Allegiance: British India; India
- Branch: British Indian Army; Indian Army
- Service years: 1933–1963
- Rank: Lieutenant General
- Units: 13th Frontier Force Rifles (until 1947); Rajput Regiment (after 1947)
- Commands: XV Corps; Delhi and Rajasthan Area; Assam Area; 181 Independent Brigade group 4 Rajput
- Conflicts: World War II; Siege of Tobruk; Indo-Pakistani War of 1947; Sino-Indian War
- Awards: Param Vishisht Seva Medal

Lieutenant General Bikram Singh, PVSM (4 July 1911 – 22 November 1963) was a General Officer in the Indian Army. He was the General Officer Commanding XV Corps when he was killed in the 1963 Poonch Indian Air Force helicopter crash.

== Early life and education ==
Singh was born on 4 July 1911. He attended the Prince of Wales Royal Indian Military College at Dehradun. In 1930, he was selected to attend the Royal Military Academy Sandhurst.

== Military career ==
=== Early career ===
Singh graduated from Sandhurst in 1933 and was commissioned as a second lieutenant and placed in the unattached list of the Indian Army. Newly commissioned Indian officers were attached with a British unit before being sent to an Indian unit. He was attached with the Royal Berkshire Regiment. After an year's attachment, he was posted to the 6th Royal Battalion (Scinde), the 13th Frontier Force Rifles which was stationed at Kohat in the North-West Frontier Province (NWFP). Subsequently, the battalion moved to Razmak and join the Razmak Brigade. He spent three years in NWFP, till 1937, participating in multiple active operations.

=== World War II ===
During the outbreak of World War II in 1939, he was serving with his battalion. He moved with the battalion to North Africa and took part in the Western Desert campaign and was present during the Siege of Tobruk. He subsequently served in Iran and Iraq during the Middle East campaigns. At the end of the war, he was selected to attend the Staff College, Quetta. He graduated in 1946 and was appointed Deputy Assistant Quartermaster General (DAQMG) 26th Indian Infantry Division which was deployed in the Far East.

=== Post-Independence ===
In April 1947, he was promoted to the rank of lieutenant colonel and appointed commanding officer of the 4th battalion, the Rajput Regiment (4 RAJPUT). During the partition of India, civil disturbances and riots erupted across the country. He led his battalion in quelling these disturbances in Calcutta and subsequently in Ranchi. In October that year, he was promoted to colonel. In Kurukshetra, the country's largest refugee camp was set up. Singh was posted to the camp to help run it.

In February 1948, civilian authorities took over the administration of the refugee camp. Singh handed the camp over and was promoted to the rank of brigadier. He took command of an infantry brigade engaged in active operations in Jammu and Kashmir during the Indo-Pakistani War of 1947-1948. After the war, he commanded another infantry brigade in the Kashmir Valley. In December 1949, he was appointed commander of the 181 Independent brigade group in Assam.

He has a long stint in Assam, commanding the brigade group for four years, till 1953. He was then appointed Brigadier in charge administration (Brig Adm) of the Eastern Command. In 1954, the headquarters of the Eastern Command moved from Ranchi to Lucknow. As the Brig Adm, Singh was responsible for the transfer of the HQ and oversaw its successful completion.

=== General officer ===
In August 1955, Singh was promoted to the rank of major general and appointed general officer commanding an infantry division. He commanded the division for over two-and-a-half years which was based in Jammu and Kashmir. He subsequently was appointed GOC Assam area, a static formation, which he commanded for a little over a year. In February 1959, he moved to Delhi having been appointed GOC Delhi & Rajasthan Area. As the GOC of the area, he oversaw the Army Day and the Delhi Republic Day parades in 1960 and 1961. In June 1961, he was promoted to the rank of lieutenant general and appointed GOC XV Corps, headquartered at Srinagar.

== Death and legacy ==
On 22 November 1963, Singh was killed when his helicopter crashed en route to Poonch. In a great loss to the Indian Armed Forces, the crash claimed six distinguished officers. The officers who were on the helicopter apart from Singh were:

- Lieutenant General Daulet Singh, General Officer Commanding-in-Chief Western Command
- Air Vice Marshal Erlic Pinto, Air Officer Commanding-in-Chief Western Air Command
- Major General N K D Nanavati, General Officer Commanding 25 Infantry Division
- Brigadier S R Oberoi, Commander 93 Infantry Brigade
- Flight Lieutenant S S Sodhi, Pilot

The news of the air crash came as a shock to the nation. A black-bordered extraordinary Gazette of India was issued on 23 November. The issue was raised in both houses of Parliament of India and addressed by the Minister of Defence Yashwantrao Chavan. The Rajya Sabha observed one minute's silence as a mark of respect to the memory of the deceased and adjourned for the day. The Ministry of Defence, the three service headquarters and all defence establishments in New Delhi were closed on 23 November as a mark of respect. All public events of the Defence Minister and Service Chiefs were also cancelled. The officers were laid to rest with full military honours. Singh was awarded the Param Vishisht Seva Medal posthumously on 26 January 1964.

A memorial has been built at the site of the air crash, commemorating the names of the victims. The Indian Army organises an annual event to pay homage to them. An 'Akhand Path' is also organised by the people of Poonch and surrounding villages, as a mark of their love and affection towards the departed souls, every year to commemorate the tragic accident. A statue of Singh is installed in Jammu and a memorial in his ancestral village of Siana in Nawanshahr. A library and a museum dedicated to him is also being constructed. The Bikram Chowk in Jammu is also named for the general. Two committees – the Lieutenant General Bikram Singh Society at Kahma village and the Lieutenant General Bikram Singh Yadgaar Committee in Jammu organise ceremonies, akhand paths, blood donation camps among other events to remember him.

== Honours and decorations ==

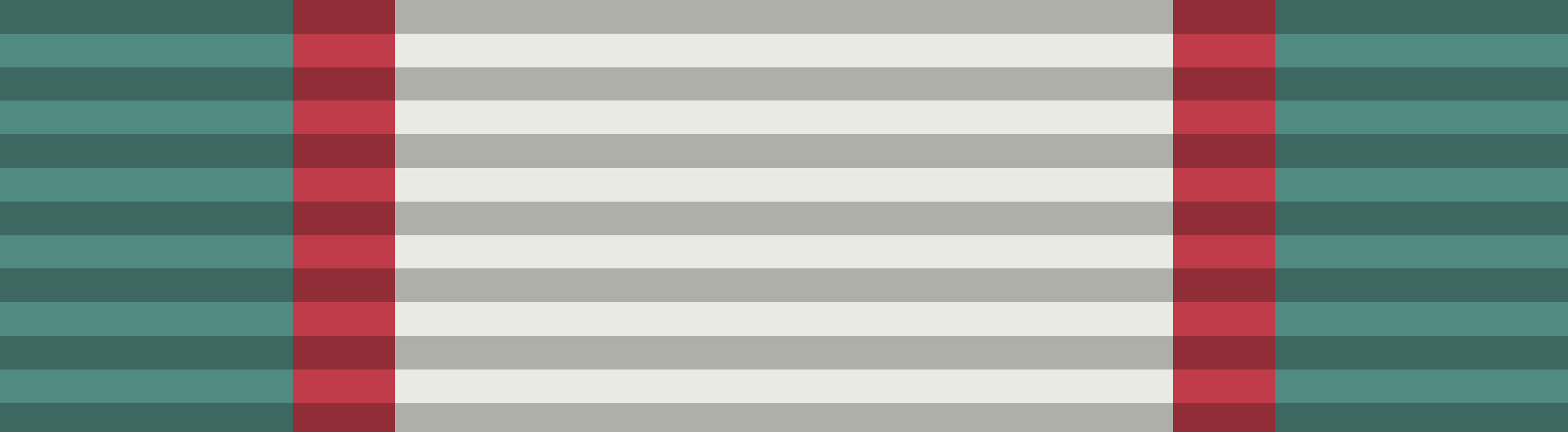

Param Vishisht Seva Medal	General Service Medal		India General Service Medal (1936)
Indian Independence Medal	1939–45 Star	Africa Star	War Medal 1939–1945

== Bibliography ==
- Vaz, J Clement (1997), Profiles of Eminent Goans: Past and Present, Concept Publishing Co, ISBN 978-8170226192

Military offices
Preceded by S. D. Verma	General Officer Commanding XV Corps; 1961-1963	Succeeded by Kashmir Singh Katoch
