= Jahangir Park =

Park in Karachi, Pakistan

- Interactive map of Jahangir Park
- Location: Saddar, Karachi, Pakistan
- Coordinates: 24°51′43″N 67°01′39″E
- Area: 24,000 square metres
- Open: 1893
- Status: Operational

Jahangir Park is a public park located on Prince Rd., Saddar, Karachi, Pakistan. The park area is 24,000 square metres (6 acres) for which the land was donated by Parsi philanthropist Khan Bahadur Behramjee Jehangirjee Rajkotwala in 1893.

The park also hosted one first-class cricket match in 1956.

== Activities ==
The park is primarily for families and young children, attractions include dinosaur sculptures, green lawns and shade to provide refuge from Karachi's intense heat. Cost of entry is free, however, vehicle parking is Rs 100.

== History ==
In 1893, Khan Bahadur Behramjee Jehangirjee Rajkotwala, a Parsi benefactor, gifted the six-acre Jahangir Park, inclusive of its verdant tree population, to the inhabitants of Karachi. To enhance its appeal and utility, a cricket ground and pavilion were subsequently added to the park's infrastructure.

The park used to maintain a reading room where all daily and evening newspapers were made available.

In 2017, the Government of Sindh spent Rs. 200 million on the renovation of the park.

== See also ==
- Karachi Parsi Institute
