= 1963 Poonch Indian Air Force helicopter crash =

Helicopter Crash

1963 Poonch IAF helicopter crash
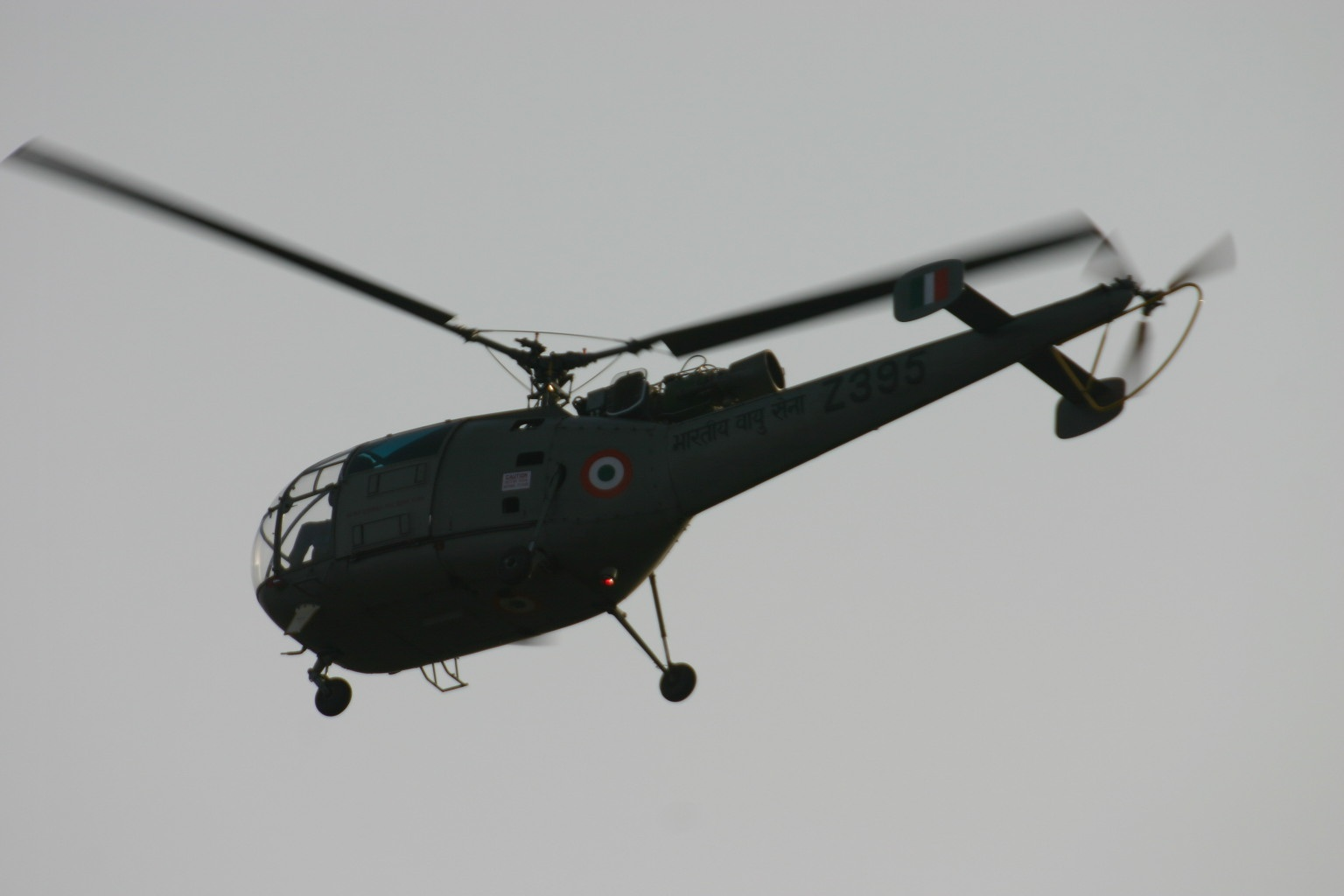
- An IAF Alouette III helicopter similar to the one involved

Accident
- Date: 22 November 1963
- Summary: Loss of control due to collision with telegraph cables
- Site: Poonch district, India

Aircraft
- Aircraft type: Aérospatiale Alouette III
- Operator: Indian Air Force
- Occupants: 6
- Passengers: 5
- Crew: 1
- Fatalities: 6
- Survivors: 0

On Friday, 22 November 1963, an Aérospatiale Alouette III helicopter of the Indian Air Force crashed in Poonch district of Indian-administered Jammu and Kashmir in the disputed Kashmir region. The aircraft was en route to Poonch town, killing all six people on board. Six Indian Armed Forces officers were on board, including three general officers, an air officer and a brigadier.

Among those killed in the crash were Lieutenant General Daulet Singh, Lieutenant General Bikram Singh and Air Vice Marshal Erlic Pinto and the pilot Flight Lieutenant S. S. Sodhi.

== Background ==
The electricity and water supply to the town of Poonch came through a channel from Betar Nullah. In October 1963, the headworks of the channel was blown by Pakistan since it was located in Pakistani-Administered Kashmir. A new water-head was constructed by the engineers of the Indian Army. By 21 November 1963, the water and electricity supply to Poonch were restored. A tour was planned to inspect the new water-head.

== Flight ==
The GOC-in-C Western Command Lieutenant General Daulet Singh and the AOC-in-C Western Air Command Air Vice Marshal Erlic Pinto were to inspect the new headwater. They arrived at Poonch from New Delhi in a Dakota aircraft at 1025 hours, where they were met by the Commander 93 Brigade, Brigadier S. R. Oberoi, MC. The GOC XV Corps Lieutenant General Bikram Singh and Air Officer Commanding Jammu & Kashmir Air Commodore Murat Singh had already arrived at Poonch from Udhampur at 0940 hours. Around the same time, the GOC 25 Division arrived in the Alouette III piloted by Flight Lieutenant S. S. Sodhi. Another Alouette also reached around 1055 hours.

An inspection of two outposts around Poonch was also planned, which had been recced already by Sodhi. The first outpost was small and dusty, as reported by Sodhi and two helicopters would not be able to land. Thus, Pinto decided that the second helicopter would proceed to the second outpost with Murat Singh and await the arrival of the officers. The others trooped into the first helicopter and proceeded towards the first outpost. The helicopter landed and the inspection got underway.

After the completion of the inspection, the party took off for the second outpost which was 15 miles away. Sodhi took the route along the Poonch River. Three minutes after getting airborne, the Alouette collided with two parallel line of telegraph cables. The cables ran between two poles - one on a cliff at a height of 300 feet and the other on the opposite bank of the river at a height of 100 feet. The helicopter struck the cables at a height of around 200 feet. Sodhi lost control and the helicopter crashed into the river bed, about 400 yards away. The crash spot was 2.5 miles from the Cease fire line.

== Aftermath ==
The news of the air crash - it was also the same day as the assassination of President John F. Kennedy - came as a shock to the nation. A black-bordered extraordinary Gazette of India was issued on 23 November. The issue was raised in both houses of Parliament of India and addressed by the Minister of Defence Yashwantrao Chavan. The Rajya Sabha observed one minute's silence as a mark of respect to the memory of the deceased and adjourned for the day. The Ministry of Defence, the three service headquarters and all defence establishments in New Delhi were closed on 23 November as a mark of respect. All public events of the Defence Minister and Service Chiefs were also cancelled. The officers were laid to rest with full military honours.

The Chief of the Air Staff Aspy Engineer constituted a committee of inquiry headed by the Deputy Chief of Air Staff Air Vice Marshal Ramaswamy Rajaram with officers from the Army, Air Force and Intelligence Bureau as members. Daulet Singh, Bikram Singh and Pinto were awarded the Param Vishisht Seva Medal posthumously on 26 January 1964.

== Memorials ==
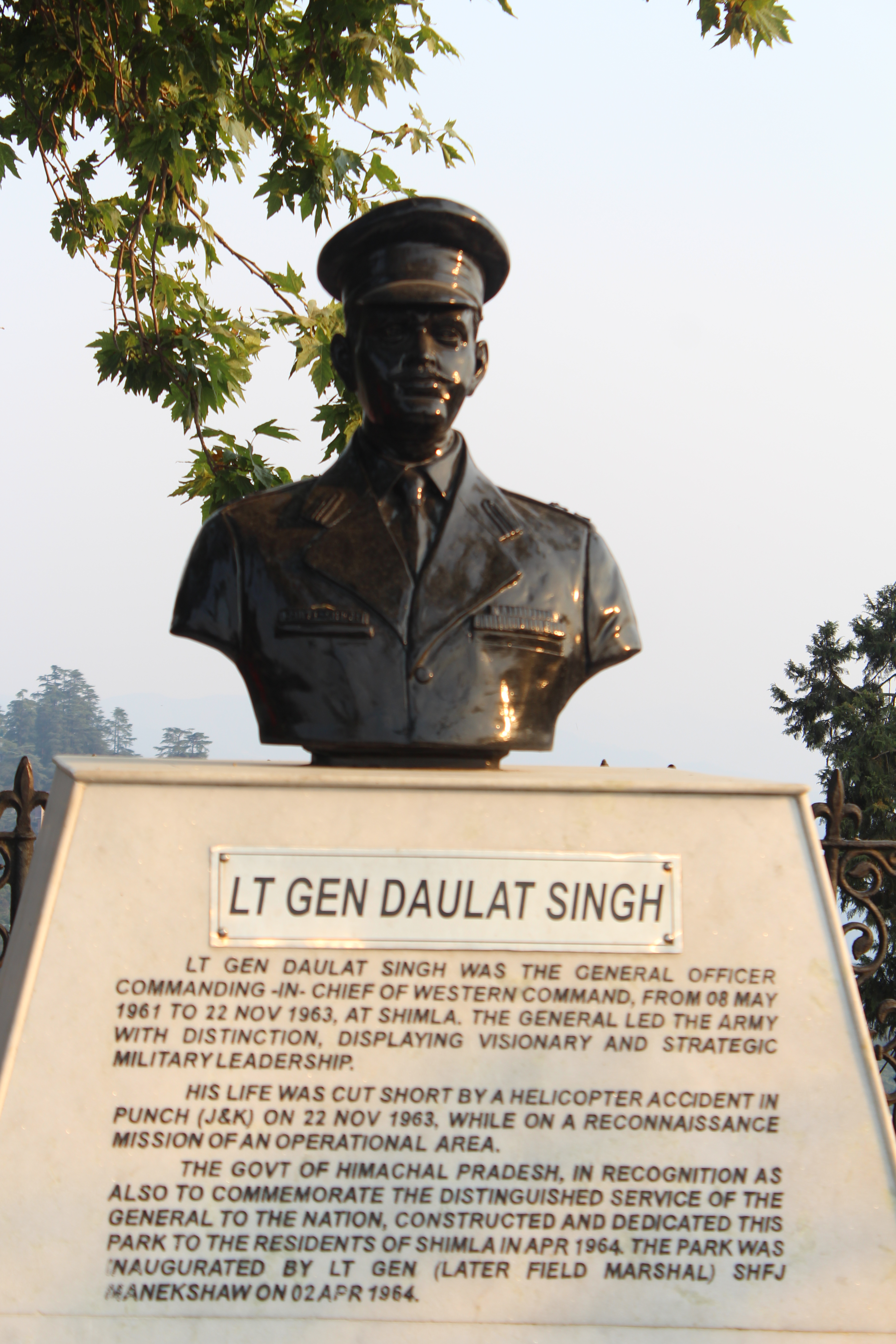
Bust of Lt Gen Daulet Singh in the park named for him in Shimla.

In 1980, a memorial was constructed in Poonch called the Generals' memorial which paid tribute to the victims. The memorial was constructed by 10th Brigade and all the units of 25th Infantry Division, the formation commanded by Major General N. K. D. Nanavati at the time of the crash. A wreath-laying ceremony takes place every year at the memorial by units of the Indian Army on the anniversary of the crash. A monument has been built at the site of the air crash, commemorating the names of the victims. An Akhand Path is also organised by the people of Poonch and surrounding villages, as a mark of their love and affection towards the departed souls, every year to commemorate the tragic accident.

Apart from these, the Daulat Singh Park in Shimla, named for Lieutenant General Daulet Singh, has a bust of the general. A statue of Lieutenant General Bikram Singh is installed in Jammu and a memorial in his ancestral village of Siana in Nawanshahr. A library and a museum dedicated to the general is also being constructed. The Bikram Chowk in Jammu is also named for the general. Two committees – the Lieutenant General Bikram Singh Society at Kahma village and the Lieutenant General Bikram Singh Yadgaar Committee in Jammu organise ceremonies, akhand paths, blood donation camps among other events to remember him.

== Bibliography ==
- Vaz, J Clement (1997), Profiles of Eminent Goans: Past and Present, Concept Publishing Co, ISBN 978-8170226192
- Sapru, Somnath (2014), Combat Lore: Indian Air Force 1930-1945, K W Publishers Pvt Ltd, ISBN 978-9383649259
