= Daulet Singh =

Indian Army lieutenant general

Lieutenant General Daulet Singh PVSM
- Born: 4 January 1911
- Died: 22 November 1963 (aged 52)
- Military career
- Allegiance: British India; India
- Branch: British Indian Army; Indian Army
- Service years: 1931–1963
- Rank: Lieutenant General
- Commands: Western Command; 1st Armoured Division; Bombay Area; East Punjab Area
- Conflicts: World War II; Indo-Pakistani War of 1947; Sino-Indian War
- Awards: Param Vishisht Seva Medal

Lieutenant General Daulet Singh, PVSM (4 January 1911 – 22 November 1963) was a general officer in the Indian Army. He was the General Officer Commanding-in-Chief Western Command when he was killed in the 1963 Poonch Indian Air Force helicopter crash.

== Early life and education ==
Singh was born on 4 January 1911 at Lahore. He attended the St George's College, Mussoorie. In 1928, he was selected to attend the Royal Military Academy Sandhurst.

== Military career ==
=== Early career ===
Singh graduated from Sandhurst as a King's Commissioned Indian Officer in 1931. He was commissioned as a second lieutenant on 29 January and placed in the unattached list of the Indian Army. Newly commissioned Indian officers were attached with a British unit before being sent to an Indian unit. He was attached with the 2nd Battalion, York and Lancaster Regiment. After an year's attachment, he was posted to 3 Cavalry. On 29 April 1933, he was promoted to the rank of Lieutenant. Promotion to Captain followed on 29 January 1939 before the outbreak of World War II. After the war, he was promoted to the rank of Major on 1 July 1946.

=== Post-Independence ===
In August 1947, in the rank of Lieutenant Colonel, he was military assistant to the Commander-in-Chief, Indian Army General Sir Rob Lockhart. A year later, he was promoted to the rank of Brigadier and appointed commander of an armoured brigade. After a three-year tenure, he moved to army headquarters as the Director of Weapons and Equipment. In 1952, he was appointed Director of Military Operations (DMO). Early next year, in January 1953, he attended the Imperial Defence College in London.

=== General officer ===
After completing the course, he returned to India and was appointed General officer commanding (GOC) East Punjab Area in the acting rank of major general. He subsequently commanded an infantry division in the Bengal Area. He later became GOC Bombay Area. On 29 January 1956, Singh was made substantive major general. He also commanded the 1st Armoured Division.

On 4 January 1957, he was appointed Quartermaster General at Army HQ. While serving as QMG, he was promoted to the acting rank of Lieutenant General on 1 August 1958. On 29 January 1959, he became substantive lieutenant general and appointed general officer commanding a corps.

On 8 May 1961, Singh was appointed General Officer Commanding-in-Chief Western Command at Shimla. In 1962, a court of inquiry (COI) was ordered against then Major General Sam Manekshaw, the Commandant of the Defence Services Staff College. The COI was convened with Singh as the presiding officer. The COI under Singh exonerated Manekshaw, saving his career. Manekshaw would later go on to become the 7th Chief of the Army Staff, leading the Army to victory in the Indo-Pakistani War of 1971 and becoming the first Field Marshal of India.

Singh led the Western Command during the Sino-Indian War of 1962.

== Death and legacy ==
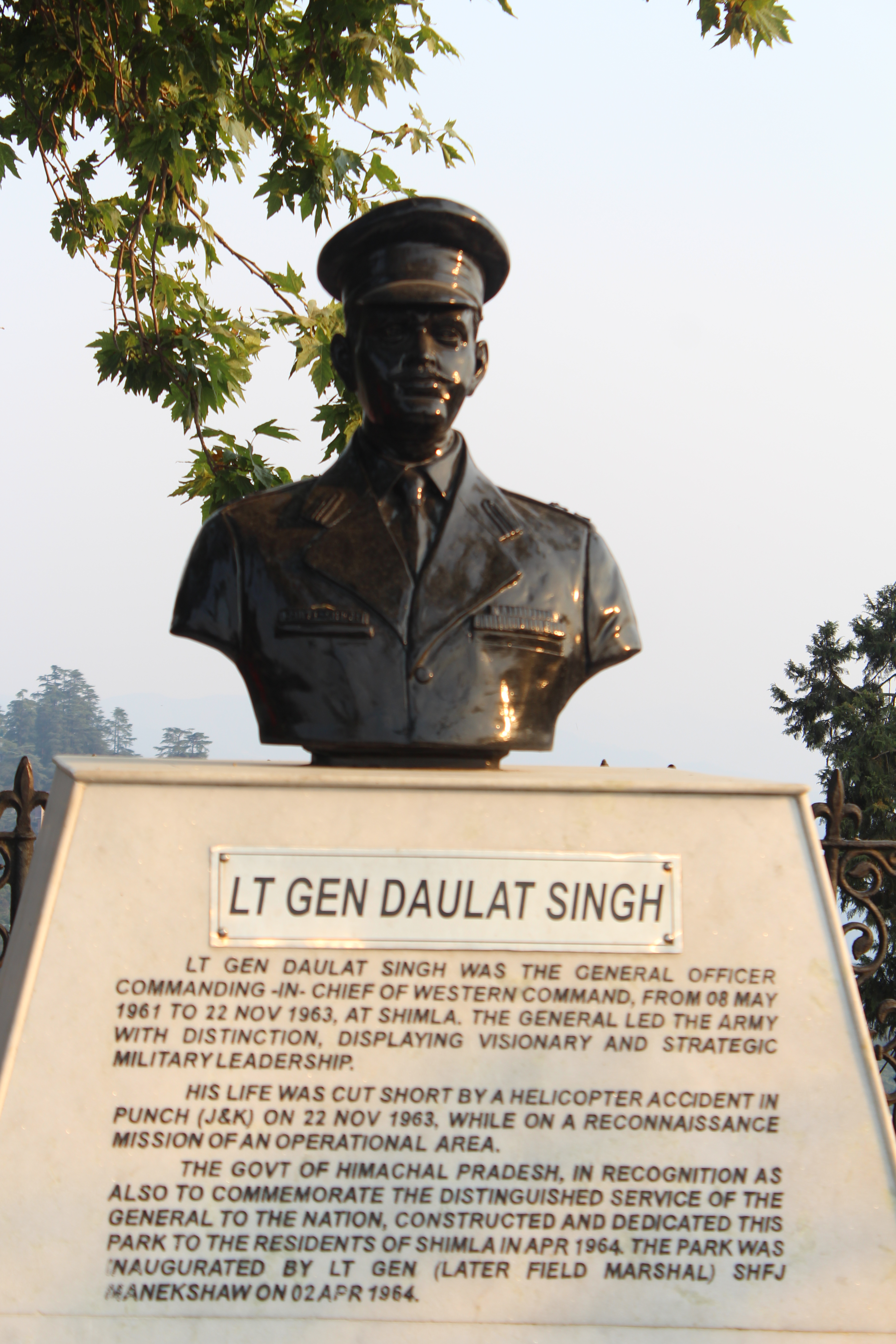
Bust of Lt Gen Daulet Singh in the park named for him in Shimla.

On 22 November 1963, Singh was killed when his helicopter crashed en route to Poonch. In a great loss to the Indian Armed Forces, the crash claimed six distinguished officers. The officers who were on the helicopter apart from Singh were:

- Lieutenant General Bikram Singh, General Officer Commanding XV Corps
- Air Vice Marshal Erlic Pinto, Air Officer Commanding-in-Chief Western Air Command
- Major General N K D Nanavati, General Officer Commanding 25 Infantry Division
- Brigadier S R Oberoi, Commander 93 Infantry Brigade
- Flight Lieutenant S S Sodhi, Pilot

The news of the air crash came as a shock to the nation. A black-bordered extraordinary Gazette of India was issued on 23 November. The issue was raised in both houses of Parliament of India and addressed by the Minister of Defence Yashwantrao Chavan. The Rajya Sabha observed one minute's silence as a mark of respect to the memory of the deceased and adjourned for the day. The Ministry of Defence, the three service headquarters and all defence establishments in New Delhi were closed on 23 November as a mark of respect. All public events of the Defence Minister and Service Chiefs were also cancelled. The officers were laid to rest with full military honours. Singh was awarded the Param Vishisht Seva Medal posthumously on 26 January 1964.

A memorial has been built at the site of the air crash, commemorating the names of the victims. The Indian Army organises an annual event to pay homage to them. An 'Akhand Path' is also organised by the people of Poonch and surrounding villages, as a mark of their love and affection towards the departed souls, every year to commemorate the tragic accident.

In April 1964, the Government of Himachal Pradesh constructed the General Daulet Singh Park in Shimla in recognition and to commemorate the distinguished service of Singh. A bust of Singh is also installed in the park. The park was inaugurated by Singh's successor as Western Army Commander – then Lieutenant General Sam Manekshaw.

== Personal life ==
Singh was married to Uma Devi, of the Kapurthala royal family. The couple had three sons and a daughter.

== Bibliography ==
- Vaz, J Clement (1997), Profiles of Eminent Goans: Past and Present, Concept Publishing Co, ISBN 978-8170226192
- Singh, Depinder (2002), Field Marshal Sam Manekshaw, M.C.: Soldiering with Dignity, Natraj Publishers, ISBN 978-81-85019-02-4

Military offices
Preceded by Pran Nath Thapar	General Officer Commanding-in-Chief Western Command; 1961 - 1963	Succeeded by Sam Manekshaw
