= M. K. Janjua =

Pakistani Air Commodore (1914–1982)

Air Commodore M. K. Janjua
- ایم کے جنجوعہ

District Manager Pakistan International Airlines (United Kingdom)
- In office February 1960 – February 1964

Director of Personnel Royal Pakistan Air Force
- In office January 1951 – March 1951

Commanding Officer No. 4 Squadron RIAF
- In office 10 September 1942 – 23 March 1944

Personal details
- Born: Mohammad Khan Janjua; 19 May 1914 Jhelum District, British India
- Died: 1 August 1982 (aged 68) United Kingdom
- Children: 8
- Relatives: Haider Raza (brother-in-law)
- Education: Indian Military Academy; Imperial Defence College

Military service
- Branch/service: British Indian Army (1935–1938); Royal Indian Air Force (1938–1947); Pakistan Air Force (1947–1951)
- Years of service: 1935-1951
- Rank: Air Commodore
- Commands: No. 4 Squadron RIAF
- Battles/wars: Mohmand campaign of 1935; World War II; Burma campaign; Indo-Pakistani War of 1947

Mohammad Khan Janjua (Note: Urdu: محمد خان جنجوعہ) (19 May 1914 — 1 August 1982) was a one-star rank air officer of the Royal Pakistan Air Force and was its most senior officer. He was arrested for his alleged role in the 1951 Rawalpindi conspiracy coup that was allegedly orchestrated by Communists against Prime Minister Liaquat Ali Khan. The plot was exposed and Faiz Ahmad Faiz, one of those implicated, said that Janjua was not involved. According to Faiz, Janjua was neither a conspirator nor a Communist, but rather a victim of circumstances beyond his control.

== Early life ==
Mohammad Khan Janjua was born on 19 May 1914 in Motal, a remote village in the Salt Range of Jhelum District into a Muslim Rajput family. He was the eldest child of nine children, four brothers and five sisters. The family claimed descent from the Janjua King, Raja Ajmal Dev Janjua, who later converted to Islam and changed his name to Raja Mal Khan.

Janjua joined the Indian Military Academy in February 1933. He was the second cadet to receive a scholarship from the Indian Military Academy Scholarship Fund which was Rs. 750 per annum.

== Personal life ==
Janjua married twice and had eight children. One of his wives, Tahira, was the sister of his colleague Haider Raza. They met after the Partition of British India in 1947, when Tahira traveled to Pakistan to visit her brother and his wife during a holiday. They later had a daughter named Shahidah.

== Service years ==
=== British Indian Army (1934–1938) ===
Janjua was commissioned into the British Indian Army as a Second Lieutenant on 15 July 1935. He was attached to the 2nd Battalion of the Highland Light Infantry on 10 August 1935 and transferred to the 7th Rajput Regiment on 2 December 1936.

=== Royal Indian Air Force (1938–1947) ===
On 20 September 1938, three lieutenants from the British Indian Army transferred to the Royal Indian Air Force. They were Janjua, Diwan Atma Ram Nanda, and Burhan-ud-Din. In December 1942, acting Flight Lieutenant Janjua was mentioned in despatches for distinguished service in Waziristan.

Wing Commander Janjua was a member of the Air Force Sub-Committee set up to divide the assets of the Royal Indian Air Force.

=== Royal Pakistan Air Force (1947–1951) ===
After the Partition of British India in August 1947, Janjua transferred his service to the Royal Pakistan Air Force (RPAF), was promoted to Group Captain, and appointed Air Officer-in-Charge of Administration. He was promoted to the rank of Air Commodore in January 1948. Janjua was appointed Director of Training & Reserve in July 1949.

Air Commodore Janjua played a key role in the RPAF's selection of the Hawker Tempest over the Supermarine Spitfire during the post-partition division of military assets. Although many within the Air Force favoured the Spitfire, Janjua singlehandedly changed the decision in favour of the Tempest. In the September 2023 edition of the PAF's Second to None magazine, Polish researcher Franciszek Grabowski wrote: "Although controversial, it seems it was a wise decision".

In 1948, Janjua was among three officers invited to act as Judges in selecting the best entry in the 1946–1947 Gold Medal Essay Competition by the United Service Institution of India and Pakistan.

On 13 April 1948, during his first visit to a unit of the RPAF, Governor-General Muhammad Ali Jinnah visited the Flying School at Risalpur—despite his deteriorating health. Accompanied by his sister, Fatima Jinnah, he was welcomed by Squadron Leader Asghar Khan and reviewed a ceremonial parade composed of Flight Cadets from the 2nd, 3rd, 4th, and 5th GD(P) courses. Jinnah also renamed the school as the Royal Pakistan Air Force College. Air Commodore Janjua and Asghar Khan designed the RPAF flag which Jinnah then presented to the Air Force.

In early 1950, Janjua was selected for a staff course at the Imperial Defence College. On his return in January 1951, he was appointed Director of Personnel.

Sometime in 1950, Commander-in-Chief Air Vice-Marshal Atcherley and Air Commodore Janjua, who was Officer-in-Charge of the RPAF, expressed their concerns regarding the training of officers. The outcome of these discussions led to the establishment of two feeder schools, one in Sargodha and the other in Lower Topa.

==== Arrest ====
On 9 March 1951, Janjua was placed under house arrest for suspected complicity in the Rawalpindi conspiracy against the government of Prime Minister Liaquat Ali Khan.

== Civilian career ==
=== Pakistan International Airlines ===
Janjua succeeded R. H. Kazmi as the District Manager in the United Kingdom for Pakistan International Airlines (PIA) in February 1960.

He was succeeded by Q. Afzal Husain in February 1964 and returned to the head office of the PIA in Karachi.

== Political career ==
In April 1971, Janjua was a founding member of "West Pakistanis in Solidarity with Bengal", a London-based group of West Pakistani socialists who publicly supported the Bengali independence movement and condemned the Pakistan Army's operations in East Pakistan.

== Later life ==
In October 1974, a new English periodical called 'Democratic Pakistan' began publishing from London, representing the National Awami Party of Pakistan. Janjua was the editor.

== Awards and decorations ==
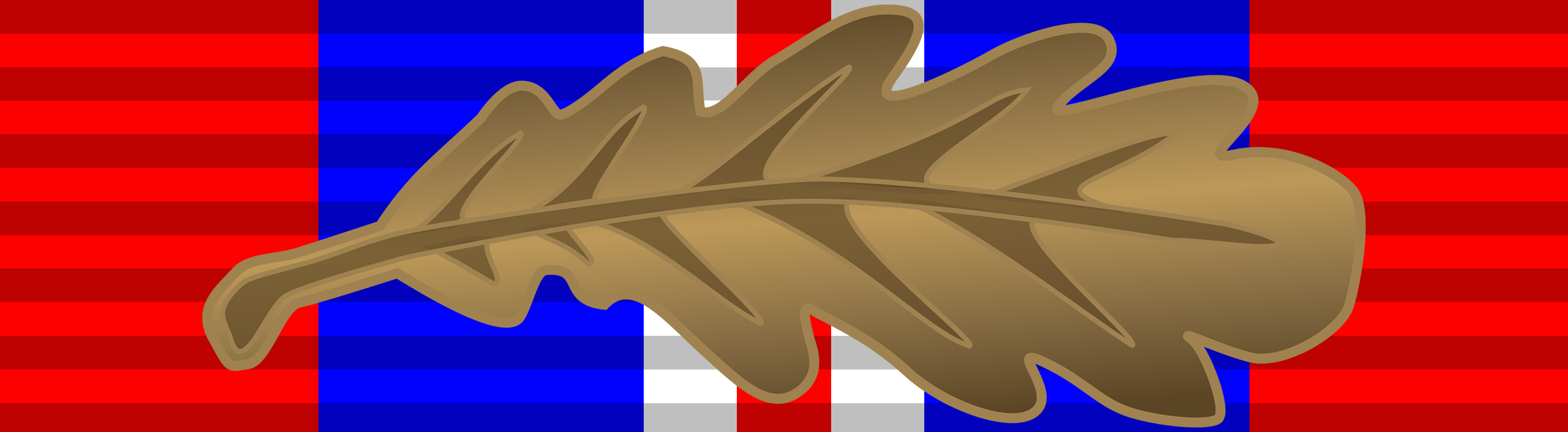
War Medal 1939–1945 (with MiD oak leaf)

== Published work ==
M. K. Janjua (12 February 1969). Open Letter to Those in Power and to the Aspirants to Power in Pakistan. Center for Research Libraries.
