= M. A. Rahman =

Pakistani Air Vice Marshal (1920-1989)

Air Vice Marshal M. A. Rahman
- ایم اے رحمان
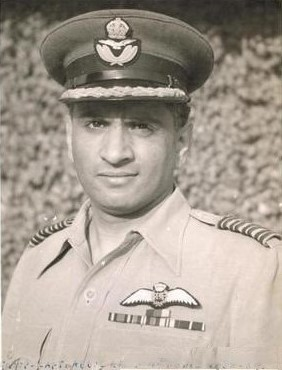
- Portrait as a Group Captain, c. 1949

Commander-in-Chief Pakistan Air Force
- In office (acting); 30 September 1961 – 20 October 1961

Air Attaché to Embassy of Pakistan, Washington, D.C.
- In office December 1964 – January 1968

6th Chief of Staff Pakistan Air Force
- In office 29 March 1959 – 25 November 1964
- Commander-in-Chief: Air Marshal Asghar Khan (1957-1965)
- Preceded by: Maqbool Rabb
- Succeeded by: Mohammad Akhtar (as Deputy Chief of Air Staff)
Other offices
Air Officer Commanding No. 1 Group PAF
In office 16 December 1955 – November 1957
Commander PAF Station Kohat
In office April 1952 – May 1953
In office August 1947 – November 1947
3rd Commandant PAF College
In office October 1949 – June 1951
Preceded by	Nur Khan
Commander PAF Station Peshawar
In office November 1947 – September 1948
Officer Commanding No. 10 Squadron RIAF
In office 23 August 1946 – 8 May 1947
Preceded by	Haider Raza

Personal details
- Born: Mirza Abdul Rahman; 1 January 1920 (RIAF Records); 10 July 1921 (RPAF Records) Sialkot, Punjab Province (British India)
- Died: 25 November 1989 (aged 68 or 69) Pakistan
- Education: No. 1 EFTS, Begumpet; Air Command and Staff College; Imperial Defence College

Military service
- Branch/service: Royal Indian Air Force (1940-1947); Pakistan Air Force (1947-1968)
- Years of service: 1940-1968
- Rank: Air Vice Marshal
- Commands: PAF College; PAF Station Peshawar; PAF Station Kohat; No. 10 Squadron RIAF
- Battles/wars: World War II; Burma campaign; Indo-Pakistani War of 1947
- Awards: Individual PAF Golf Championship (1960)

Mirza Abdul Rahman (Note: Urdu: مرزا عبدالرحمن) (1 January 1920 (Note: He had three different birth dates, see #Early life.) — 25 November 1989) better known as M. A. Rahman, was a former two-star rank air officer who was among the pioneering officers of the Pakistan Air Force. He served as its sixth Chief of Staff from 1959 to 1964.

Throughout his career, he held several key positions, including Commander of PAF Station Kohat and Peshawar, Commandant of PAF College, Air Officer Commanding No. 1 Group, Assistant Chief of Air Staff (Operations), Assistant Chief of Air Staff (Administration), and Chief of Staff.

== Early life ==
Mirza Abdul Rahman was born on 1 January 1920 or 1922 or 10 July 1921 in Sialkot.

== Service years ==
=== Royal Indian Air Force (1940-1947) ===
Mirza Abdul Rahman was commissioned into the Royal Indian Air Force (RIAF) on 30 November 1940 as an Acting Pilot Officer at the Initial Training School in Lahore. He was promoted to pilot officer on 15 February 1942 and began training at No. 1 EFTS, Begumpet. By 20 December 1943, he rose to flying officer and joined No. 7 Sqn RIAF in Campbellpur as a squadron pilot, after training with No. 152 OTU.

On 1 April 1945, he was promoted to Flight Lieutenant and served as a squadron pilot with No. 1 Squadron in Imphal until 8 August 1945. The squadron then moved to Kohat and he continued his role as a Flight Lieutenant, also serving as Adjutant to the United Kingdom, until 30 April 1946 when he was attached to the Personnel Holding Unit. (Note: Temporary assignment location where military personnel are placed while awaiting a new posting, transfer, or reassignment.)

After his promotion to Squadron Leader, he commanded No. 10 Sqn stationed in Chakeri from 23 August 1946 to 8 May 1947.

=== Pakistan Air Force (1947-1968) ===
Following the Partition of British India on 14 August 1947, he joined the Royal Pakistan Air Force and was promoted to Wing Commander and appointed Commander of Station Kohat. In November 1947, he assumed command of PAF Station Peshawar. By October 1949, he was promoted to Group Captain and became the 3rd Commandant of the PAF College. He was selected for the Air Command and Staff College on 13 August 1951.

On 16 December 1955, he was promoted to Air Commodore and appointed Air Officer Commanding No. 1 Group RPAF. At the time, the RPAF was organised into two groups: No. 1 Group Headquarters for Operations, based in Peshawar, and No. 2 Group Headquarters for Maintenance, located at Drigh Road. In November 1957, he was selected to attend the Imperial Defence College in London. On 29 March 1959, he became Chief of Staff of the Pakistan Air Force.

Air Commodore M. A. Rahman won the PAF Golf Championship by beating Air Marshal Asghar Khan by one stroke on 12 December 1960. The tournament, played over 36 holes, was the first of its kind in the Armed Forces, with Mirza Abdul Rahman leading with a score of 84.

While serving as Chief of Staff, he was promoted to Air Vice Marshal on 23 December 1961. He also briefly served as acting Commander-in-Chief for nearly a month while Air Marshal Asghar Khan traveled to Bangkok for the 19th SEATO Military Advisors Conference in late 1961. He served as Chief of Staff until 25 November 1964. He was appointed as the Air Attaché to Washington, D.C. in December 1964.

== Later life ==
On 1 October 1969, he assumed the charge of office as a new Member of the Pakistan Central Public Service Commission.

== Death ==
Mirza Abdul Rahman died on 25 November 1989 in Pakistan.

== Effective dates of promotion ==
Insignia	Rank	Date
	Air Vice Marshal	23 December 1961
	Air Commodore	December 1955
	Group Captain	October 1949
	Wing Commander	August 1947
	Squadron Leader	23 August 1946
	Flight Lieutenant	1 October 1944 (acting)
	Flying Officer	30 May 1942
	Pilot Officer	30 November 1940 (acting); 15 February 1942
