= C. G. Devashar =

Indian Air Force officer

Air Marshal Charandas Gurudas Devashar PVSM
- Born: 19 June 1924
- Military career
- Allegiance: India
- Branch: Indian Air Force
- Service years: 1942–1976
- Rank: Air Vice-Marshal
- Awards: Param Vishisht Seva Medal

Air Marshal Charandas Gurudas Devashar (19 June 1924 – before 10 February 2017) was an officer in the Indian Air Force and a recipient of the Param Vishisht Seva Medal (PVSM).
