= Hindu Gymkhana, Karachi =

Colonial-era building in Karachi, Pakistan

Hindu Gymkhana
- ہندو جِمخانہ
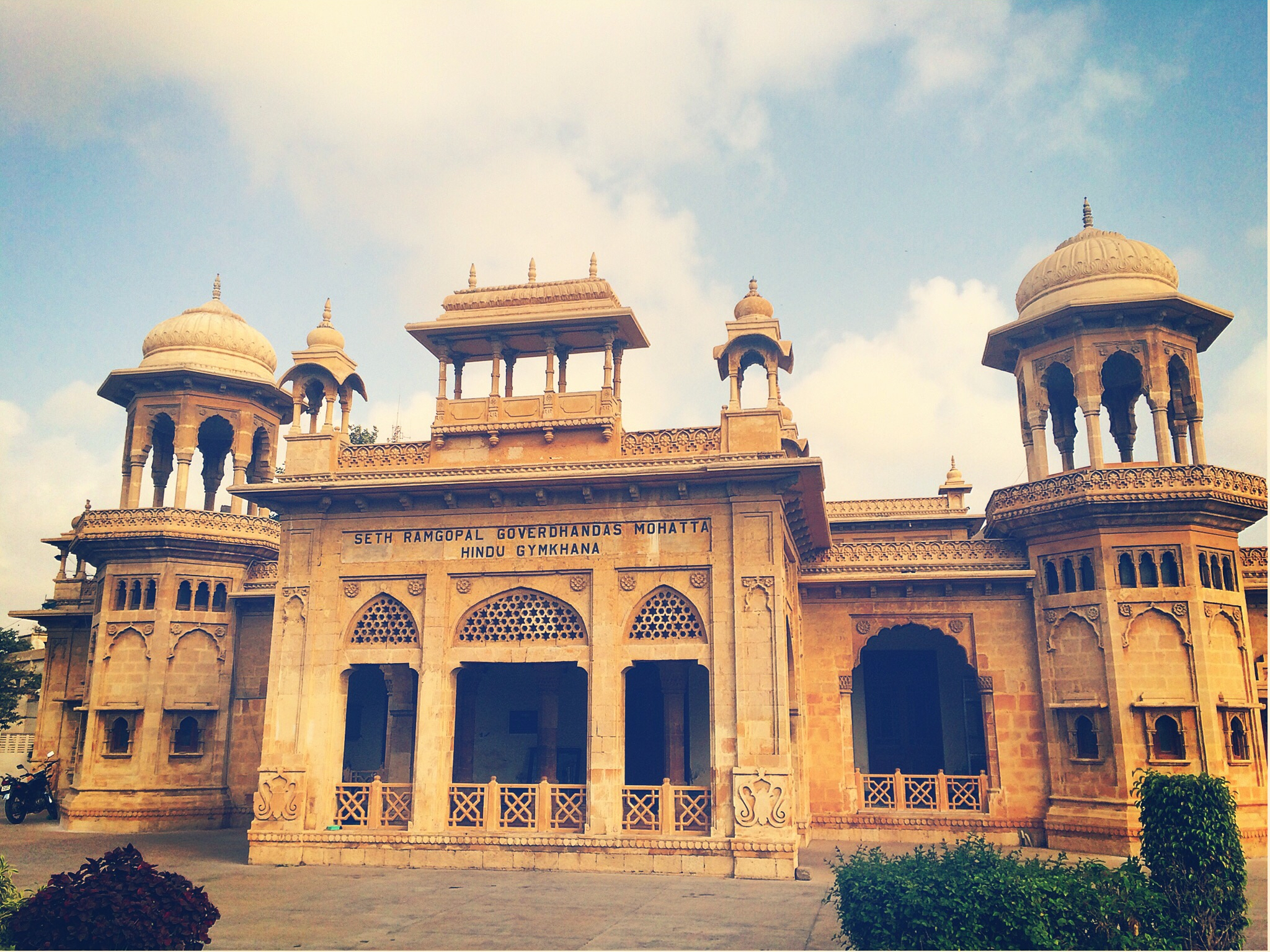
- The Hindu Gymkhana Building now houses the National Academy of Performing Arts

General information
- Type: Headquarters
- Location: Saddar, Karachi, Pakistan
- Coordinates: 24°51′08″N 67°01′16″E
- Completed: 1925

Design and construction
- Architect: Agha Ahmed Hussain

The Hindu Gymkhana (Sindhi:هندو جمخانه; Urdu: ہندو جِمخانہ) is a colonial-era building located on Sarwar Shaheed Road in Karachi, Pakistan. It was the first public building in Karachi to adopt the Mughal-Revival architectural style. It was established in 1925 by the Karachi's Hindus as an exclusive club for their community. The building houses the National Academy of Performing Arts.

== History ==
The Hindu Gymkhana was established by the Seth Ramgopal Gourdhanandh Mohatta and the Hindu community in 1925 on a plot of 39,297 m^{2} (422,990 sq ft). It was designed by Agha Ahmed Hussain. It was named Seth Ramgopal Goverdhandas Mohatta Hindu Gymkhana at that time.

After the Independence, the Hindu Gymkhana was taken over by the Evacuee Trust Property Board. In 1978, about 60 per cent the land of Hindu Gymkhana was given to the Police Department and another 5,016 m^{2} (53,990 sq ft) were given to the Federal Public Service Commission. Later, 2,926 m^{2} (31,500 sq ft) were given to the Aligarh Muslim University and another 334 square metres was allotted to Abdul Majeed Khan received almost of land as an allotment. Currently it has only 3,762.5 m^{2} (40,499 sq ft) of land compared to 39,297 m^{2} (422,990 sq ft) in 1925. The building's condition deteriorated over the years, and it was almost demolished in 1984. It was protected by the intervention of the Heritage Foundation of Pakistan. In 2005, the Pakistan president Pervez Musharraf handed the building over to National Academy of Performing Arts The Hindu Gymkhana now houses Pakistan's National Academy of Performing Arts (NAPA), founded by Zia Mohyeddin – a prominent stage and Pakistani television personality – who led it until his death in 2023.

== Architecture ==
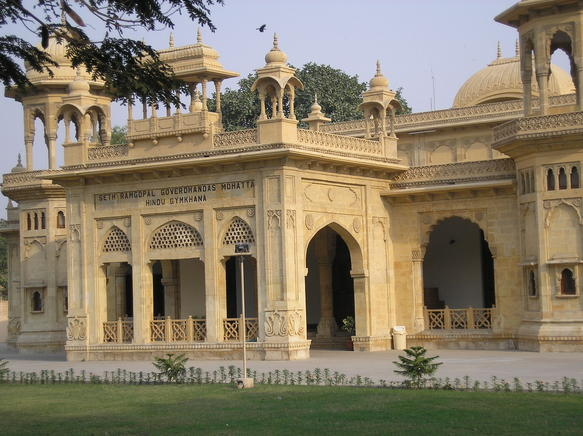

The building was designed by architect Agha Ahmed Hussain, with a design based on the tomb of Itamad-ud-Daulah (1628) in Agra.

The building is small in size (on a plot of land measuring 39,297 square metres). and consists primarily of a hall and some smaller rooms used for administrative purposes. Stone for the 61-centimetre-thick (2 ft) walls was acquired in Bijapur. The roof line is defined by delicate massing of cupolas and balustrades directly influenced by Akbar's Fatehpur Sikri. The octagonal corner towers framing the projecting central jharoka are capped with chattris, highlighting the influence of Rajasthani Style of Palaces. Smaller chattris highlight the corners of the projecting porch that carry the drooping bangladar roof used in Emperor Akbar's period.

The projecting chajjas are supported by ornamental brackets. The cupolas of the chattris are reinforced concrete and the walls are dressed in Gizri stone. Some of the carved elements are of Jodhpur stone.

== Protected Sindh Cultural Heritage building ==
This historic building is widely considered to be an architectural gem in Karachi and is protected under the Sindh Cultural Heritage Protection Act. Therefore, nobody is allowed to carry out new construction, repairs, renovations in this building without the approval of Karachi Building Control Authority and the Government of Sindh.

Surprisingly a historical building like this had deteriorated due to lack of maintenance in the recent past and was going to be demolished in 1984 but the Heritage Foundation Pakistan back then intervened to save it.

== Relocation of NAPA ordered ==
In December 2018, The Supreme Court of Pakistan had directed the Sindh government to shift NAPA to another location from this Hindu Gymkhana building but, as of 11 February 2020, compliance to this directive could not be made and NAPA was still functioning there.

== Movements by Hindu community to get back Hindu Gymkhana ==
The Hindu Gymkhana belonged to Hindus before Independence. The Hindu community of Karachi have no place in Karachi to celebrate religious festivals. In 1960, the first movement to handover Hindu Gymkhana back to the Hindu community was launched by activists Bhagwandas Chawla, Khubchand Bhatia and Seth T Motandas. However, the movement was ended due to the 1965 war. It was launched again but was ended due to the 1971 war. In 1980, the movement was launched again by Ramesh Mana co-chairperson of Pak-Hindu Welfare Association when the Muhammad Zia-ul-Haq government decided to sell the property. Later another movement was launched by P.K. Shahani, Hindu activist which compelled the parliamentarians to raise this issue in the Pakistan National Assembly and the Hindu Gymkhana was added on the list of heritage sites under the Sindh Heritage Act. But later the Pervez Musharraf’s government took over the Hindu Gymkhana and gave it to the National institute of performing arts(NAPA).

In 2009, the Pakistan People's Party protested when the president Pervez Musharraf handed over the Hindu Gymkhana to the NAPA. In 2009, the Sassui Palijo, Sindh’s Culture Minister said that the Pervez Musharraf hearing his relatives’ advice forcefully vacated the Hindu Gymkhana and handes it over to Napa. She added that the Hindu Gymkhana will be reserved for activities of the Hindu community.

In 2014, the Pakistan Hindu Panchayat sent a letter to the Pakistan Chief Justice on the Hindu Gymkhana issue. In 2014, the Shree Ratheshawar Maha Dev Welfare approached the court for giving back the Hindu Gymkhana back to the Hindus.

== See also ==
- Punjab Club
- Karachi Gymkhana
- Lahore Gymkhana
- Sind Club
- Karachi Parsi Institute (formerly Parsi Gymkhana)
