= Sind Club =

Club in Karachi, Pakistan

- Interactive map of Sind Club
- Full name: Sind Club
- Address: Fatima Jinnah Rd near Frere Hall, Civil Lines, Karachi, Sindh 75530; Karachi, Sindh; Pakistan
- Location: Civil Lines (near Frere Hall), Karachi, Sindh, Pakistan
- Coordinates: 24°50′57″N 67°01′55″E
- Owner: Sind Club
- Operator: Sind Club
- Type: Gentlemen's club, sports club
- Current use: Private club and sports/recreation facilities

Construction
- Built: 1880–1883
- Opened: 1876
- Years active: 1871–present
- Architect: Colonel Le Mesurier

Website
- www.sindclub.org.pk

The Sind Club is a historic gentlemen's club located in Karachi, Sindh, Pakistan. It was established c. 1870.

== History ==
The Sind Club was inaugurated in 1876. In 1883, the residential chambers were completed first, followed by the construction of the Club House in 1883, which became the social and administrative centre of the establishment. The club was designed by Colonel Le Mesurier.

The Sind Club was originally established as a men's-only institution. Women were permitted to attend only specific events, including a ladies' dinner held every two months and the annual Sind Club Ball.

Until 1950, when the Prime Minister of Pakistan lived across the road, the club continued to be used predominantly by Europeans. The first Pakistani members joined the Sind Club in 1952. They included Syed Wajid Ali, Colonel Iskander Mirza, and Cowasjee Rustom Fakirjee. In 1965, Masud Karim became the first Pakistani president of the club. Since then, membership has included members of Pakistan's social elite.

== See also ==
- Punjab Club
- Karachi Parsi Institute (formerly Parsi Gymkhana)
- Karachi Gymkhana
- Lahore Gymkhana
- Hindu Gymkhana, Karachi
