= Karachi Gymkhana =

Gymkhana in Karachi and Cricket Ground

- کراچی جِمخانہ
- KG
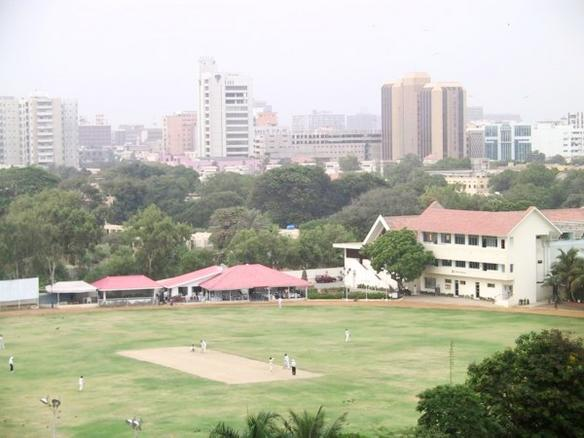
- Karachi Gymkhana Ground, overlooking downtown Karachi
- Interactive map of Karachi Gymkhana
- Address: Club Road (opposite Commissioner House); Karachi, Sindh; Pakistan
- Location: Club Road, Saddar, Karachi, Sindh, Pakistan
- Coordinates: 24°50′55″N 67°01′38″E
- Owner: Karachi Gymkhana
- Operator: Karachi Gymkhana
- Type: Gymkhana (sports club), cricket ground
- Surface: Grass
- Current use: Multi-sport club and cricket ground

Construction
- Opened: 1886

Ground information

International information
- First women's ODI: 25 March 2004: Pakistan v West Indies
- Last women's ODI: 1 January 2006: India v Sri Lanka
- As of 4 September 2020; Source: CricketArchive

The Karachi Gymkhana (KG) (Sindhi: ڪراچي جمخانه, Urdu: کراچی جِمخانہ) (founded in 1886) is a premier gymkhana (sports club) in the city of Karachi, Sindh, Pakistan. It is located on Club Road in Karachi, opposite the Commissioner House.

Formerly, it was a first class cricket ground and hosted first-class matches between 1926-27 and 1986-87.

== History ==
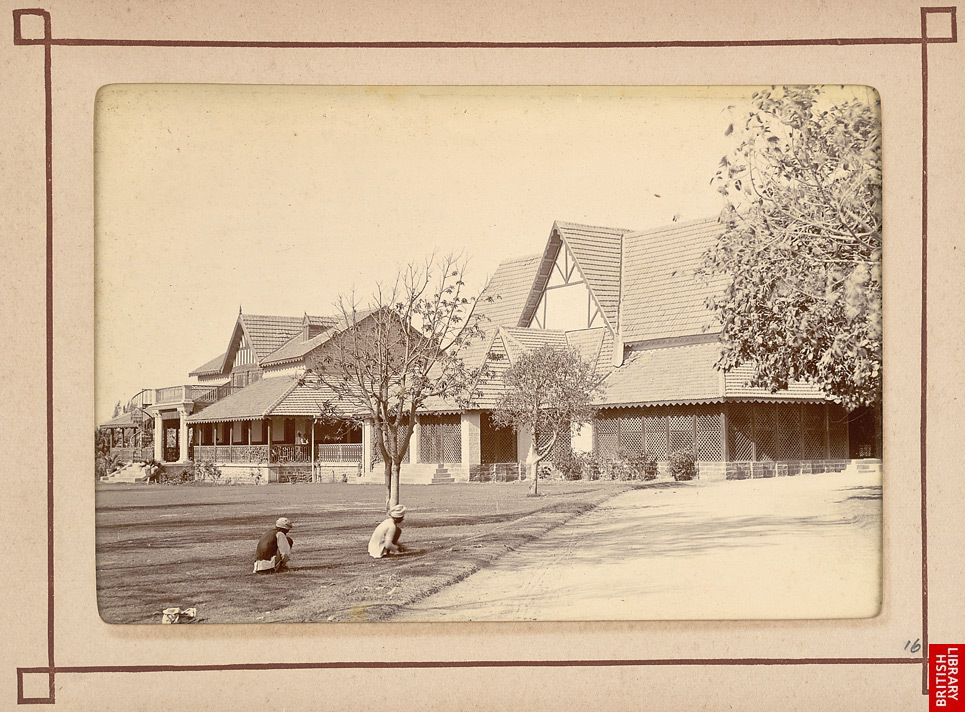
Karachi Gymkhana Club in 1890.

The club was founded in 1886. It is one of the oldest gymkhanas in Pakistan.

== Facilities ==
The KG Club provides various sports and games facilities for its members. The club has a main building with a restaurant, snooker room, cricket ground, swimming pool, tennis, squash courts, badminton, table tennis, bridge room, gym and weight training facility. Most sports activities have coaches for newcomers. One has to pay for coaching services and membership is necessary to enroll in coaching courses.

Every year there is an annual sports festival in which members and their children take part in various sports events on the cricket ground. There are regular tournaments for squash, swimming, cricket, table tennis and tennis.

There are three types of swimming pools. One is the main pool for experienced swimmers, and there is one for learners.

== See also ==
- Punjab Club
- Hindu Gymkhana, Karachi
- Karachi Parsi Institute (formerly Parsi Gymkhana)
- Lahore Gymkhana
- Sind Club
