= Lahore Gymkhana Club =

Sports club in Lahore, Pakistan

Lahore Gymkhana
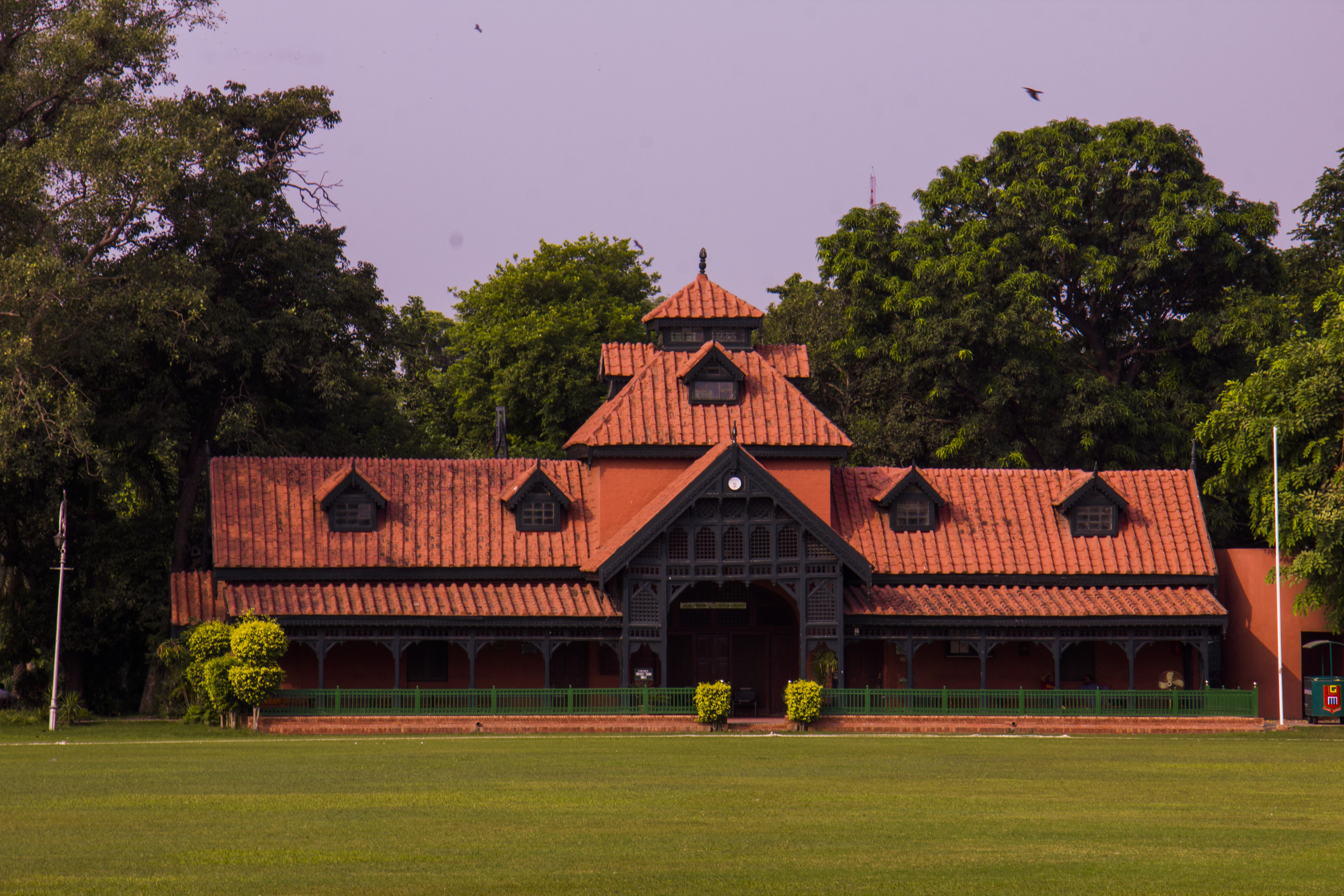
- Lahore Gymkhana Club
- Interactive map of Lahore Gymkhana
- Full name: Lahore Gymkhana Club
- Former names: Lahore and Mian Mir Institute (1878–1906)
- Address: The Upper Mall; Lahore, Punjab; Pakistan
- Location: The Upper Mall, Lahore, Punjab, Pakistan
- Coordinates: 31.5382647°N 74.3525039°E
- Type: Gentlemen's club, sports club, cricket ground
- Acreage: 0.4736 square kilometres (0.1829 sq mi)
- Current use: Members-only club and sports/social facilities

Construction
- Opened: 1878
- Years active: 1878–present

Ground information

International information
- First women's ODI: 25 March 2004: Pakistan v West Indies
- Last women's ODI: 1 January 2006: India v Sri Lanka
- As of 4 September 2020; Source: CricketArchive

The Lahore Gymkhana Club is a gentleman's and sports club in Lahore, Pakistan, founded in 1878. It offers sports facilities, including golf, swimming, cricket, squash, tennis, billiards, and a gymnasium, and organizes family concerts, lectures, and seminars for its members. The club is spread over 0.47 square kilometres (0.18 sq mi).

It also has the second oldest cricket ground in the Indian subcontinent, founded in 1878 under the name Lahore and Mian Mir Institute. The name was changed to Lahore Gymkhana in 1906. Lahore Gymkhana was moved to its present location at The Upper Mall in January 1972. It has a library consisting of almost 100,000 books on different topics.

After Pakistan's independence, the management of the club was taken over by local residents. It is presently managed by an elected 12-member executive committee. It is affiliated with Karachi Gymkhana, Islamabad Club and Chenab Club (Faisalabad, Pakistan).

== Past Prominent Club Chairpersons ==
- Nawab Muzaffar Ali Khan Qizilbash (1950 - 1953), (1955 - 1958), (1963 - 1973)
- Justice Muhammad Yaqub Ali (1959 - 1962)
- Syed Fida Hassan (1962 - 1963)
- Sardar Ahmad Ali (1979 - 1981)
- Khawaja Tariq Rahim (1981 - 1983)
- Pervez Masood (1989 - 1990), (1996 - 1997), (2001 - 2002)
- Farid ul Din Ahmad (1991 - 1992), (2003 - 2004)
- Misbah ul Rehman (1998 - 1999), (2008 - 2009), (2010 - 2011), (2011 - 2012), (2014 - 2017)
- Tasneem Noorani (1999 - 2000), (2009 - 2010)
- Kamran Lashari (2005 - 2006), (2017 - 2020)
- Zia ul Rehman (2006 - 2007), (2012 - 2013)
- Salman Siddique (2008 - 2009), (2013 - 2014), (2020 - 2023), (2023 - 2024), (2024 - 2025), (2025 - 2026)
- Sardar Ahmad Nawaz Sukhera (2026 - 2027)

== See also ==
- Punjab Club
- Karachi Gymkhana
- Hindu Gymkhana, Karachi
- Karachi Parsi Institute (formerly Parsi Gymkhana)
- Sind Club
