= Karachi Parsi Institute =

Parsi Gymkhana in Karachi

- مؤسسه زرتشتی کراچی
- KPI, Parsi Gymkhana
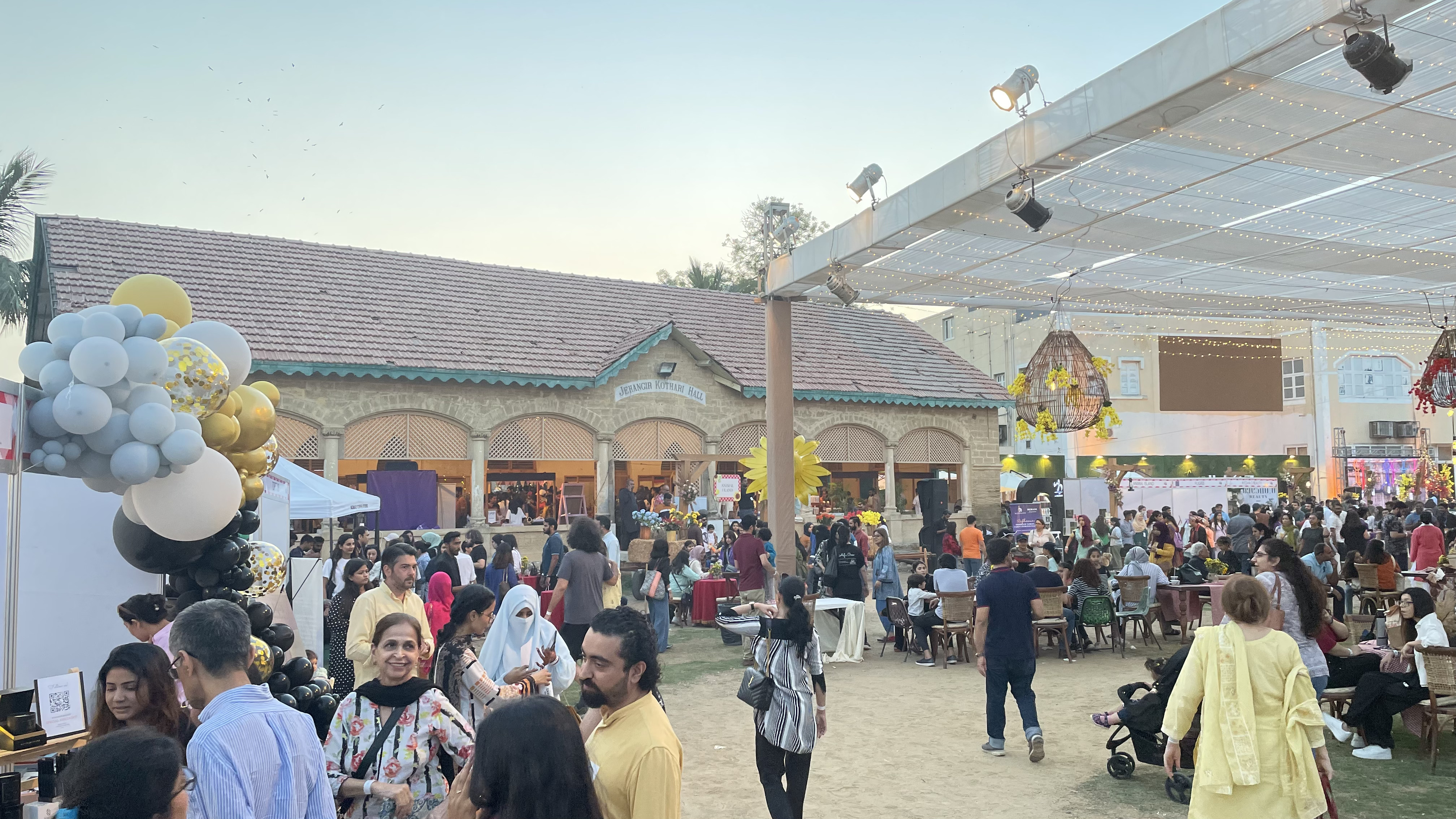
- Karachi Parsi Institute (formerly Parsi Gymkhana)
- Interactive map of Karachi Parsi Institute
- Full name: Karachi Parsi Institute (KPI)
- Former names: Parsi Gymkhana, Zoroastrian Club
- Address: Mubarak Shaheed Rd, Central Jacob Lines; Karachi, Sindh; Pakistan
- Location: Central Jacob Lines, Saddar, Karachi, Sindh, Pakistan
- Coordinates: 24°51′45″N 67°02′16″E
- Owner: Karachi Parsi Institute
- Operator: Karachi Parsi Institute
- Type: Multi-sport club Cricket ground
- Events: Cricket (first-class), football, hockey, tennis, badminton, athletics, swimming
- Surface: Grass
- Current use: Multi-sports club and recreational facilities

Construction
- Opened: 1893
- Years active: 1893–present

Karachi Parsi Institute (KPI), formerly known as Parsi Gymkhana or Zoroastrian Club, is a multisports club located in Karachi, Sindh, Pakistan. Established in 1893 by Parsi businessmen to promote education and social development within Karachi's Parsi community, the Karachi Parsi Institute has offered facilities and coaching for various sports, including cricket, football, hockey, tennis, badminton, athletics, and swimming.

== Facilities ==
The complex comprises a recreational hall, swimming pool, pavilion, and sports facilities such as cricket ground and billiard room.

== History ==
Soon after its establishment in the 19th century, the KPI became one of the liveliest Social Clubs of the city. Its cricket ground has also hosted first-class cricket matches of various seasons. This continued also after independence of Pakistan.

== See also ==
- Punjab Club
- Karachi Gymkhana
- Hindu Gymkhana, Karachi
- Sind Club
- Lahore Gymkhana
- Jahangir Park
