= Punjab Club =

Gentlemen's club in Lahore, Pakistan

- پنجاب کلب
- Interactive map of Punjab Club
- Full name: Punjab Club (formerly Roberts Club)
- Former names: Roberts Club
- Address: 3 Danepur Road, G.O.R. - I Lahore, Punjab; Pakistan
- Location: G.O.R. - I, Lahore, Punjab, Pakistan
- Coordinates: 31°32′27″N 74°20′32″E
- Operator: Punjab Club
- Type: Gentlemen's club
- Current use: Members-only club and social/recreational facilities

Construction
- Opened: 1863
- Years active: 1863–present

Website
- thepunjabclublahore.com.pk

The Punjab Club is a historic gentleman's club in Lahore, Punjab, Pakistan. It was founded in 1863.

== History ==
Punjab Club was originally founded as the Roberts Club. It holds historical significance for being the venue where the first billiard table was installed. Established in 1863 by A. Roberts, CB, with assistance from D.F. Mcleod, T.H. Thornton, R.H. Davies, and ten other officers, the Roberts Club commenced its operations on January 1, 1863.

Historical manuscripts suggest that this club, primarily comprising intelligence officers, organized dance soirees in the Gol Bagh, park in Amritsar, Punjab, after constructing a pavilion for the army band, with tents catering to refreshments. These events were colloquially known by locals as 'Paggal Nach.' Archival evidence indicates that the club eventually relocated near the Lahore Museum, possibly influenced by John Lockwood Kipling, founder of the Mayo School of Arts (currently NCA), being an active member.

When the club subsequently moved to a larger building, the current Alhamra Complex, its significance heightened. It later relocated to the current home of the Administrative Staff College on The Mall.

Post-independence, the club's building was repurposed by the government, and the club was moved to a spacious property in GOR 1.

Punjab Club continues to operate as an elite venue for the country's affluent and influential individuals.

== In popular culture ==
The club finds a mention in Mohsin Hamid's bestselling novel The Reluctant Fundamentalist where the protagonist, Changez, alludes to his class-conscious family's club membership as a symbol of high social status and wealth in Lahore, despite their diminishing finances.

== See also ==
- Lahore Gymkhana
- Karachi Gymkhana
- Karachi Parsi Institute (formerly Parsi Gymkhana)
- Hindu Gymkhana, Karachi
- Sind Club
