= Jagdev Chandra =

Indian Air Force officer

Air Commodore Jagdev Chandra, (Punjabi) (6 October 1916 – 19 Apr 1991), Royal Indian Air force and later one of the first recruits of Indian Air Force, was a war veteran, served with excellence in Burma during World War II. Was born in Peshawar, to a Punjabi family of repute, father a doctor and brother, the popular politician and Gandhian Jag Pravesh Chandra. He quit medical school to join J.R.D Tata as one of his first few students in flying. He joined the Royal Indian Air Force and was commissioned on 1 August 1940. He served as squadron leader and CO of the No.4 Squadron.

He is survived by wife Late Kanta Chandra and his two children, son Dr. Rajiv Chandra, and daughter Rashmi Solanki.
