= 24 Indian pilots =

Indians selected for RAF pilot training in 1940

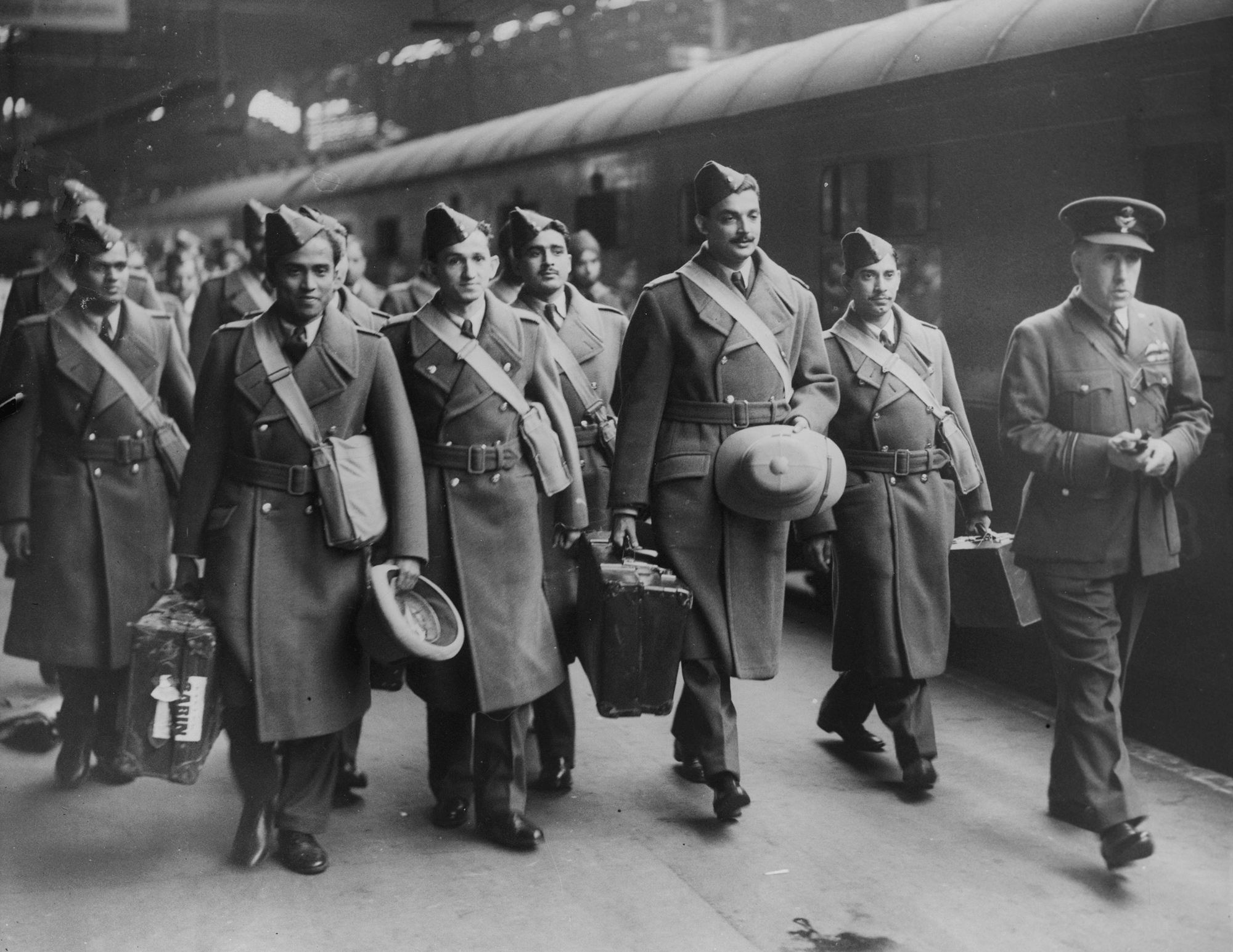
First group of Indian pilots arrive in London, 8 October 1940

In 1940, 24 Indian pilots, also known as the X-squad, were chosen from 72 trainees of the Indian Airforce 4th Pilot's Course and sent to the UK for operational training and squadron service with the Royal Air Force Volunteer Reserve (RAFVR).

The pilots included Ranjan Dutt, Erlic W. Pinto, Hari C. Dewan, Mahinder Singh Pujji and Man Mohan Singh. Of the 24, 16 qualified as pilots and six were posted to non-flying duties. Eight completed further training as fighter pilots and served in Royal Air Force (RAF) squadrons after the Battle of Britain. Others were selected for Bomber/Coastal Command.

Eight were killed during training or in action. Some of those who survived became Air Marshalls in the Indian Air Force (IAF) after independence.

== Recruitment ==
In 1940, the Air Ministry requested the British Government in India to send Indian pilots for further training in England. (Note: Calls to expand the Indian Air Force were made in early 1940.) On 8 August 1940, 24 mostly newly qualified Indian pilots were recruited from Lahore and Ambala to join the RAFVR. They left Lahore for Bombay (now Mumbai) on 3 September 1940. They departed British India as one group at the end of September 1940. (Note: A twenty fifth pilot, Dattatreya Anant Samant, not part of the group but travelled on the same liner to the UK and may have passed security as he appeared like the others. He gained a place at the RAFVR and later served No.263. Squadron RAF.)

== UK ==
The group arrived in England on the P&O liner SS Strathallan on 6 October 1940 and headed for RAF Uxbridge on 8 October. (Note: The IAF Act was passed on 8 October 1932 and in the late 1970s the date became Air Force Day in India.) Their arrival was given widespread media coverage. When they reached a London train station, they were greeted by Sir Louis Leisler Greig and the photographer William G. Vanderson. Each were individually welcomed by the Air Minister, Sir Archibald Sinclair, who handed each a note concluding "We shall be proud to have you fighting by our side". They were conducted by J. M. R. Jayakar.

After a month, the group had tea with the King before being split into two groups. (Note: K.S. Nair cites the location as Windsor Castle, while newspapers of the time say it was at Buckingham Palace.) Most were posted to No. 12 Elementary Flying Training School RAF at Prestwick to train on Tiger Moths. Advanced training was completed at No. 9 Service Flying Training School at RAF Hullavington, Wiltshire, and they received their wings on 16 April 1941. Of the 24, six were posted to non-flying duties. Eight qualified for fighter training at No. 56 OTU at RAF Sutton Bridge, including Dutt, Pujji, Mehta, Gnanamuthu and Nazirullah. They mostly served in RAF squadrons after the Battle of Britain for around three months in 1941. Others were selected for Bomber/Coastal Command.

At first they received 425 rupees per month and an annual oversees allowance of £25, which was raised to £100.

== Deaths and legacy ==
Eight of the 24 Indian pilots were killed during training or in action. Dewan, Pinto, Shivdev Singh and Dutt later became Air Marshalls in the Indian Air Force after independence.

In 2014 a statue of Pujji was erected in Gravesend, Kent. Man Mohan Singh's name is remembered on the Darwin Military Museum Memorial Wall, Australia.

A retrospective on the 4th Pilot Course, highlighting the personal and professional journeys of these 24 officers, including their wartime service, command roles, and post-retirement contributions has been published by aviation historian Anchit Gupta.

== List of pilots ==
List of 24 Indian pilots seconded to UK 1940
Pilot	Birth/death	Comment	Image	References
Kenneth Joseph Bhore	Born 1912	Arrived in England at age 27 years. Later joined Pakistan Air Force (PAF).		
Kali Prasad Choudhuri	1915 – 18 June 1941	Served with No. 10 Operational Training Unit RAF, flying Whitley N1474. Killed in action at age 26 on 18 June 1941; remains not recovered. Commemorated on Panel 1 at Golders Green Crematorium, London.		
Kanwar Haveli Shah Chopra	18 December 1915 - 6 October 1954	Retired in October 1947.		
Rustom Nariman Dastur	Died 31 August 1941	Born to Nariman Pestonji Dastur and Hoiabai Nariman Dastur, of Bandra, Bombay, India. Killed in action at age 22 years. He is buried at Dieppe Canadian War Cemetery.		
Hari Chand Dewan	1921 – 2017	Arrived in England at age 18 years. Later became Air Marshal and head of the Eastern Air Command in the Indo-Pakistani War of 1971.		
Ranjan Dutt	1922 – 2009	In England he flew Hurricanes with No. 32 Squadron RAF, and upon return to India flew Lysanders. Died in 2009.		
Mohit Mohan Ghose		Recruited at age 25 years.		
Anandaraj Samuel Gnanamuthu		Born to Captain G. D. Gnanamuthu, Civil Assistant Surgeon, of Kollegat, Coimbatore District, India. Died 11 July 1941 at age 22 years.		
Harbans Krishan Khanna		Born 15 May 1919. Died 31 Aug 1941.		
Chander Parkash Khosla		Killed in action. He is commemorated at Air Forces Memorial.		
Mian Mohd Latif		Arrived in England at age 21 years.		
Ali Raza Khan Pasha		Born 12 January 1917, died in service 18 June 1941. He is buried in the Muslim section of Brookwood Cemetery, UK.		
Hukum Chand Mehta		Died during an accident while training on 3 November 1941. He is commemorated at Newcastle-Upon-Tyne (West Road) Crematorium		
Edwin Nazirullah		For a while served No. 32 Squadron RAF. Later joined PAF.		
Erlic Wilmot Pinto	1921 – 1963	Served in the UK from 1940 to 1942. Graduated from RAF Staff College, Andover. In 1959, became Air vice marshal, India.		
Mahinder Singh Pujji	1918 – 2010	Born in 1918, died in 2010.		
Om Prakash Sanghi		Arrived in England age 25 years.		
Satya Pal Shahi		Retired in 1973.		
Gurbachan Singh		Died in crash on 12 April 1941 after hitting telephone wires.		
Shivdev Singh		Arrived in England at age 20 years. He made 22 operational flights over Germany occupied territory. Later became Air Marshal and then Vice of Air Staff in post-independent India. Credited his fame to looking like Man Mohan Singh.		
Tarlochan Singh		Born 28 July 1915. Killed whilst training.		
Man Mohan Singh		Older than the others, they referred to him as "cha-cha". Killed in action.		
Ganjam Subbaramaiah		First to die.		
Chaman Lal Tandon		Arrived in England age 21 years.		

== Gallery ==
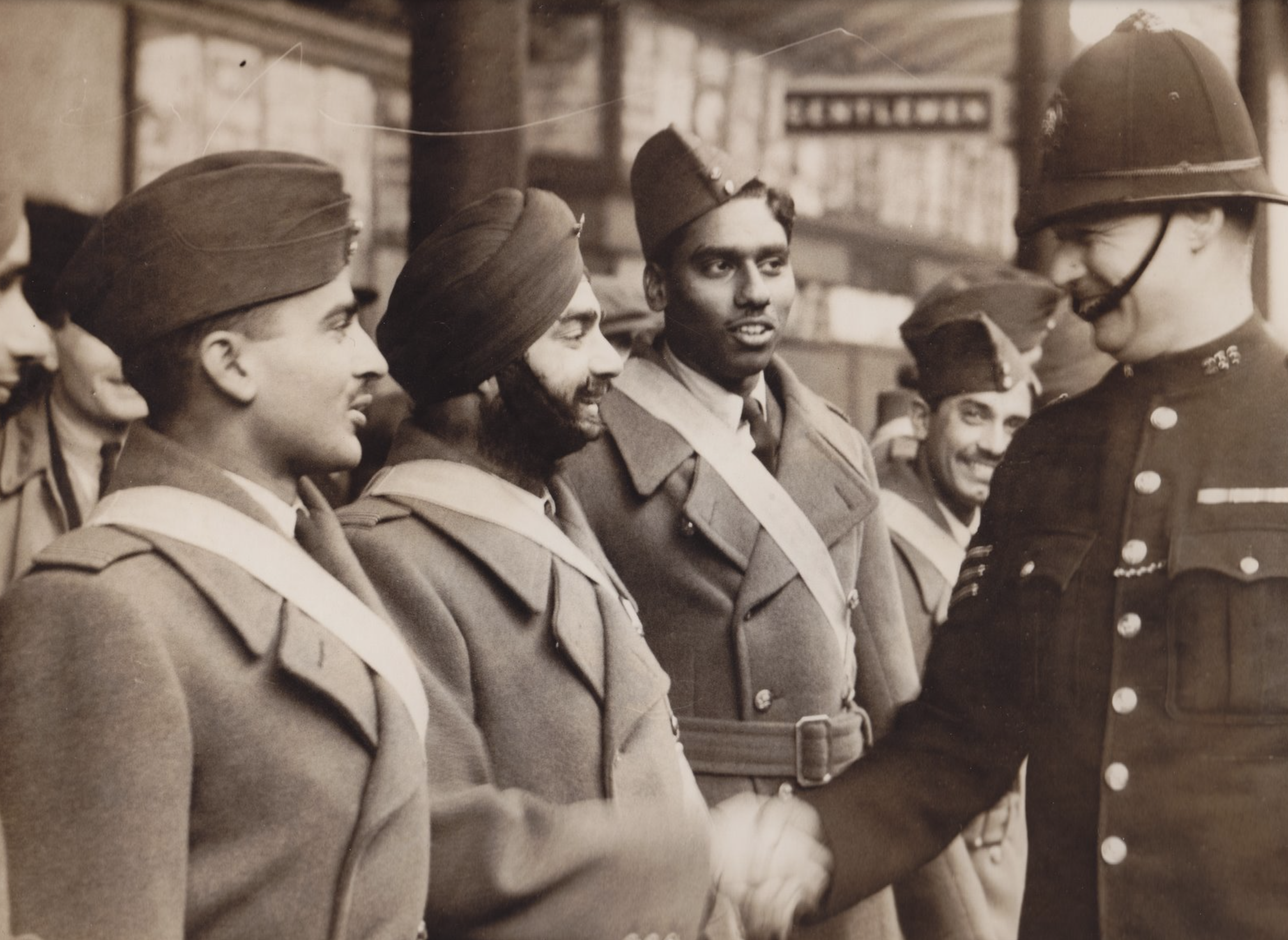
Arrival in the UK

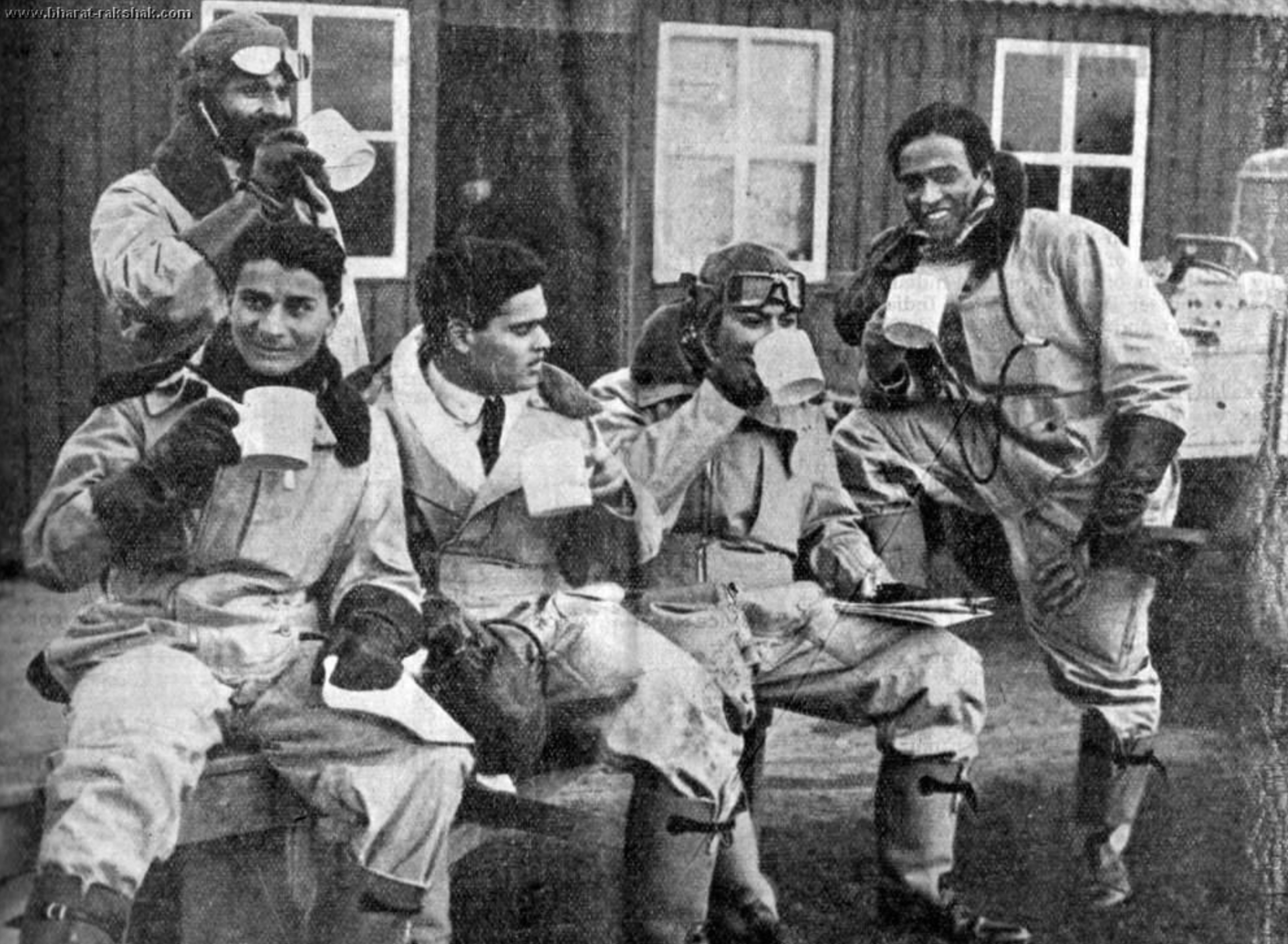
Tea time

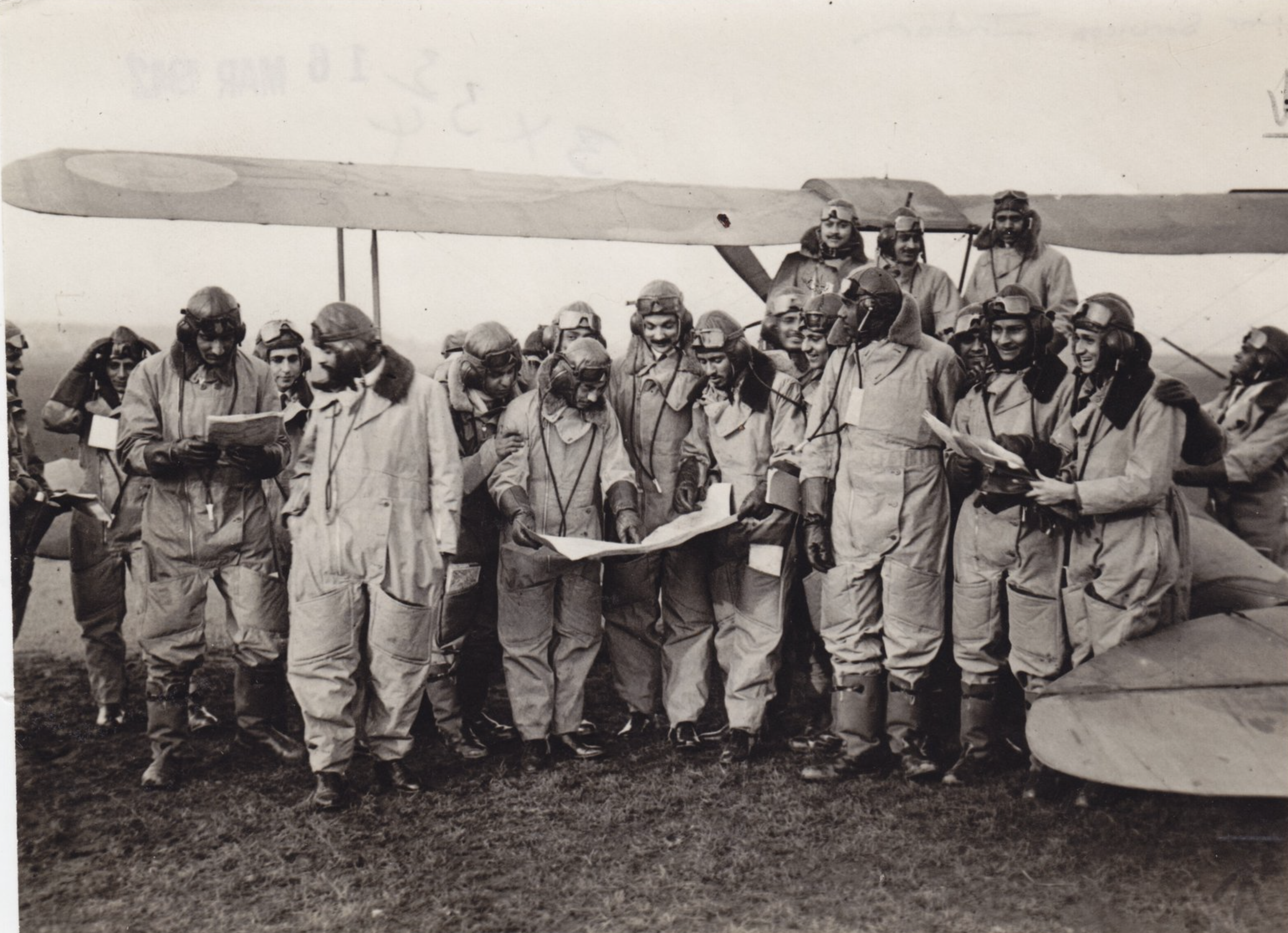
19 of the pilots studying maps
