= Man Mohan Singh (pilot) =

Indian pilot (1906–1942)

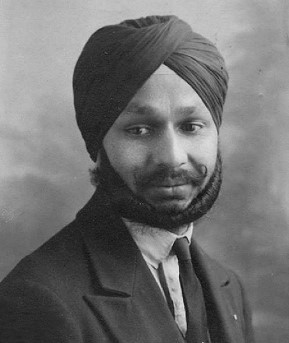
- Born: 21 March 1906; Loralai District, British India
- Died: 3 March 1942 (aged 35); Broome, Western Australia
- Military career
- Allegiance: British Indian Air Force
- Nickname: "Chacha Man Mohan Singh"
- Unit: No. 205 Squadron RAF
- Conflicts: World War II; Battle of the Atlantic; Battle of Singapore; Attack on Broome
- Memorials: Darwin Military Museum Memorial Wall; Engravings in Singapore

Man Mohan Singh (21 March 1906 – 3 March 1942), also spelled Manmohan Singh, was an early Indian aircraft pilot who, in 1930, was the first Indian to fly solo from Croydon Airport, England, to Karachi, India.

Singh was born in Loralai District (now in Pakistan). He later travelled to England and trained in civil engineering, aeronautical engineering and learnt to fly. He was of one of the contestants who participated in a competition set by the Aga Khan in 1929, who offered a prize to the first Indian to fly the England-India journey (either way), solo and within a one-month time frame. In 1930, Singh was the first to complete the journey solo, in his aircraft which he named "Miss India". However, he missed the deadline by one day and the prize was awarded to pilot Aspy Engineer. Singh later also became the first Indian to fly solo to South Africa from England.

Singh joined the Indian Air Force Volunteer Reserve as a pilot officer at the onset of the Second World War, following which he joined the RAF Coastal Command and took command of a Sunderland flying boat during the Battle of the Atlantic. He later became a flying officer with the British Indian Air Force. In 1942, he was with the flying boats that arrived at Broome, Western Australia when a Japanese air attack destroyed them all. Singh survived the attack only to drown in the harbour.

== Early life ==
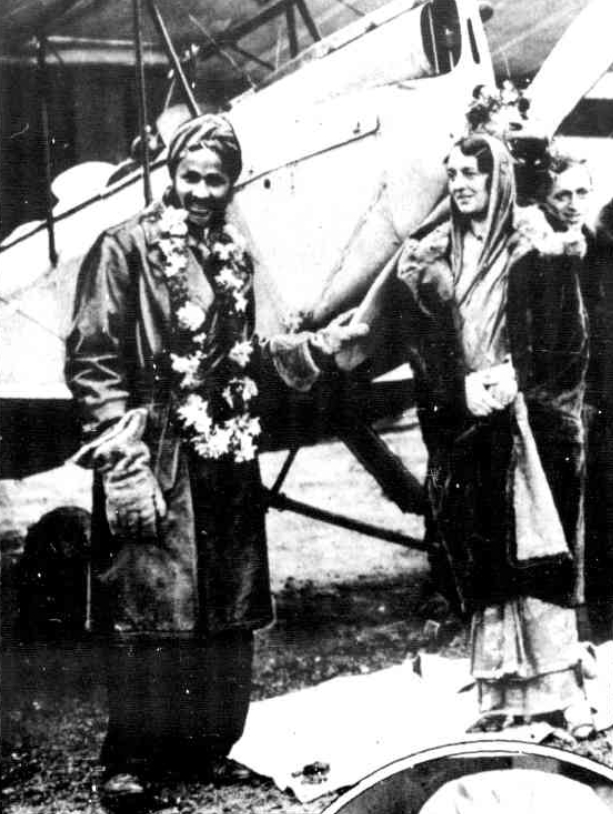
Manmohan Singh at the christening of his Gipsy Moth Miss India at Stag Lane Aerodrome with the Maharani of Cooch Behar, 1930.

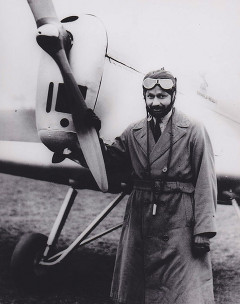
Man Mohan Singh and aircraft.

Man Mohan Singh was born in Loralai (now in Pakistan), on 21 March 1906, to physician Makhan Singh, who had at one time received the Kaisar-i-Hind Medal.

He completed his early education in Rawalpindi, first attending Denny's High School and then Gordon College. At the age of 17 years, in 1923, he travelled to England to study civil engineering and received his bachelor's degree four years later from the Bristol University. In addition, with a scholarship from the Government of British India, he studied aeronautical engineering and learnt to fly while a member of Bristol and Wessex Aeroplane Club. He received his pilot certificate from Filton on 4 September 1928. He lived in Bristol for five years, residing at 24 Woodfield Road with the Leate family.

== Career in aviation ==
=== The Aga Khan contest ===
In November 1929, keen to promote aviation, the Aga Khan, 48th Imam of the Ismaili sect of Muslims announced a prize of £500 to the first Indian pilot who could fly solo between England and India. The contestants in 1930 included; J. R. D. Tata, who later founded Tata Motors and Air India, Aspy Engineer, who would later be appointed head of the Indian Air Force, Ram Nath Chawla, who was Engineer's friend, and Singh.

The Maharani of Cooch Bihar presided over the naming ceremony of Singh's aircraft, a Gipsy Moth he named Miss India. It was fitted with an additional 20-gallon fuel tank. Singh, a self-confessed poor navigator, had a map of India painted on its rudder because, he jokingly claimed, he frequently lost his way. One editor of a flight journal reported, "Mr Man Mohan Singh called his aeroplane Miss India and he is likely to!"

On 11 January 1930 Singh made his first attempt to fly to India. That day, he departed from Croydon Airport near London, but smashed his propeller when landing at Noyon, France, the following evening. His second attempt, from Lympne on 24 January 1930, was also abandoned before completion. After flying for six days, he reached Rome and after reaching Naples, thick fog forced him to land on a mountain road in Paola, southern Italy, damaging his aircraft and injuring his left eye. Both times, he returned to Croydon.

It was at his third attempt that he completed the journey from Croydon to India, starting off on 8 April 1930, and was the first to land at RAF Drigh Road, Karachi on 9 May 1930, one day after the one-month deadline. As he had not completed the journey within the specified time frame due to a forced landing near Marseille, the prize was awarded at the decision of the Royal Aero Club, to Aspy Engineer, who completed the journey solo and within a month.

J. R. D. Tata did the journey starting in Karachi and arrived at Croydon one day after Engineer made his landmark arrival at Karachi. He later recalled that while refuelling, he came across Singh at Gaza, where he described Singh's "split-arse landing" and as he "turned to park alongside my aeroplane, just missed crashing into it by inches! It was Man Mohan Singh". He described Singh as "enthusiastic" and explained how Singh hunted desert gazelles while flying close to ground.

The whole series of events was regularly reported by The Times and Flight. Singh received a hero's welcome upon his return to Bristol when he was greeted at the station by his landlords Mr and Mrs Leate and their daughters Jean and Margaret with garlands of flowers. The president of the Bristol Indian Student Society, G. A. Ahmad recalled his students from university holidays to attend a special reception.

=== Aviator for Patiala state ===
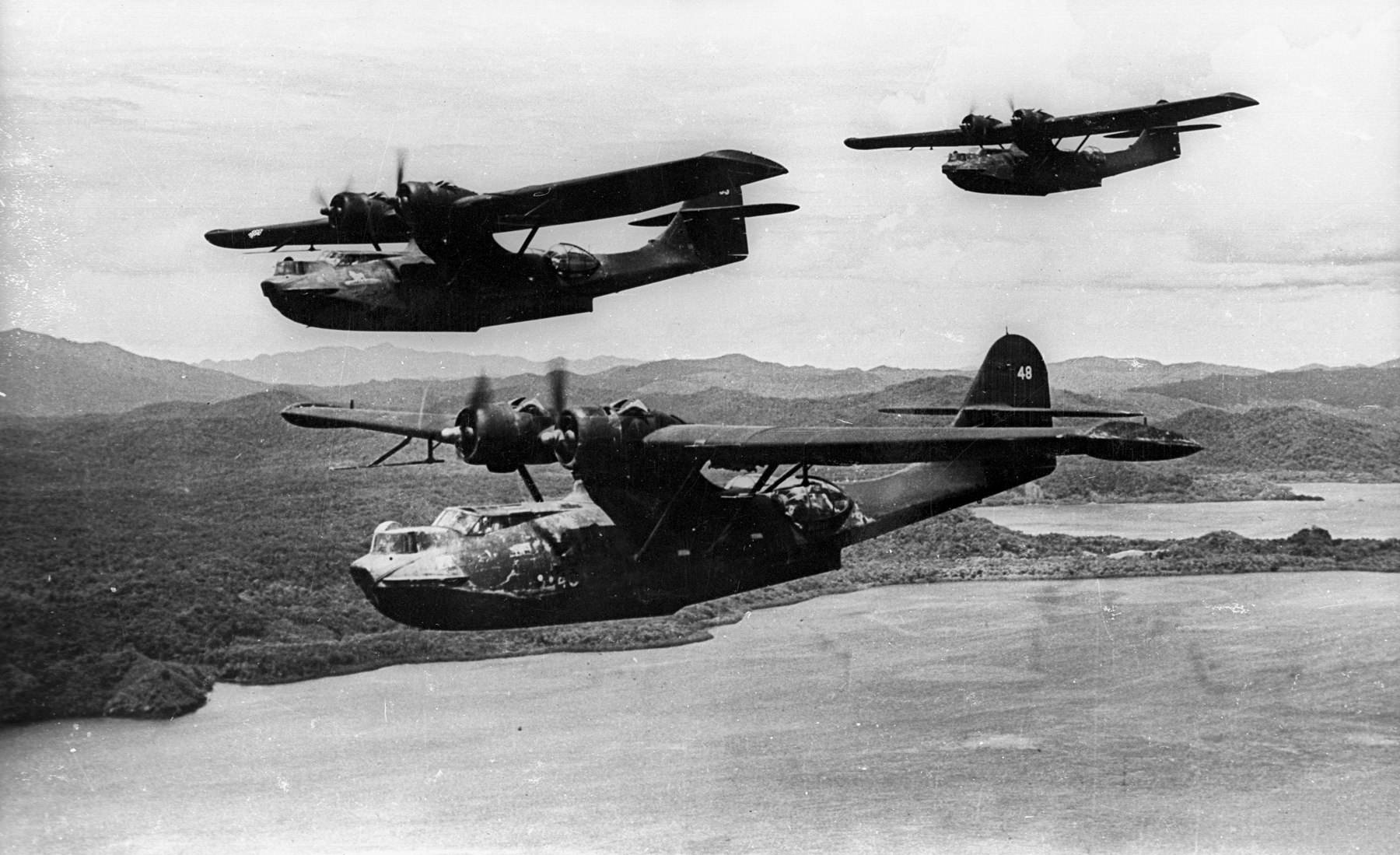
Catalinas in flight during the Second World War

As a result of his achievement, Maharaja Bhupinder Singh, ruler of Patiala state, appointed Singh as his chief personal pilot and he subsequently became the first Indian to fly solo the journey from England to South Africa, albeit following his fourth attempt to do so and after a crash which resulted in a broken leg and a wrecked "Miss India". By this time, he was a familiar and popular figure at Croydon airport.

=== Air Force pilot during the Second World War ===
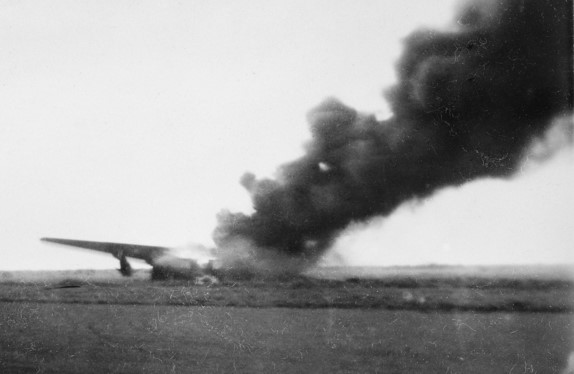
Aftermath of the Japanese attack on Broome.

Singh joined the Indian Air Force Volunteer Reserve as a pilot officer at the onset of the Second World War. He was one of the 24 Indian pilots seconded to England for training and action, where he was affectionately referred to by colleagues as "Chacha Man Mohan Singh" (uncle).

He was appointed to the RAF Coastal Command and took command of a Sunderland flying boat during the Battle of the Atlantic. His role was to find submarines. Later, he became a flying officer in the British Indian Air Force based in Singapore, taking responsibility for a Catalina flying boat in operations in Indonesia and the Philippines. After withdrawing from Singapore due to the extent of their losses in the Japanese invasion, his squadron moved to Java and then to Broome, Western Australia, where he contributed to the rescue of Dutch civilians.

On 3 March 1942, after the flying boats reached Broome, a Japanese air attack by nine Japanese Mitsubishi Zeroes began just before 10 am and caused the destruction of all the flying boats remaining on the water in Broome harbour. Singh is believed to have survived the initial attack only to drown in the harbour, being unable to swim. Eighty-seven other people were also killed.

== Legacy ==
Singh is remembered on the Darwin Military Museum Memorial Wall and his name is also inscribed on the Kranji War Memorial in Singapore. His story is recounted in Defence of Europe by Sikh Soldiers in the World Wars, written by his nephew Mohindra S Chowdhry and published by Troubador in 2018.

== See also ==
- Australian Sikh Heritage Trail
- Sikhism in Australia

== Bibliography ==
- Nair, K. S. (2019). The Forgotten Few; The Indian Air Force in World War II. Noida, UP: Harper Collins. ISBN 978-93-5357-067-5.
