= Shivdev Singh =

Shivdev Singh PVSM
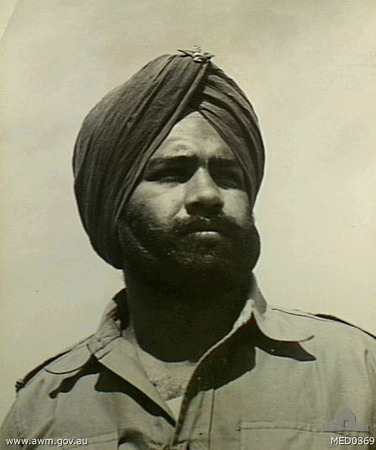
- Shivdev Singh c.1942

Personal details
- Born: 20 December 1919
- Died: 29 December 1993 (aged 74)
- Education: RAF Cranwell
- Awards: Param Vishisht Seva Medal

Military service
- Allegiance: British India (1940–1947); India (1947–1973)
- Branch/service: Royal Indian Air Force; Indian Air Force
- Years of service: 1940-1973
- Unit: No. 3 Squadron IAF; No. 4 Squadron IAF; No. 6 Squadron IAF; No. 12 Squadron IAF
- Battles/wars: World War II; Indo-Pakistani War of 1947; Indo-Pakistani War of 1971

Air Marshal Shivdev Singh PVSM (20 December 1919 - 29 December 1993) was a senior officer in the Indian Air Force. During the Second World War he was among the first 24 Indian pilots selected from the Indian Air Force's 4th Pilot's Course to be seconded to the United Kingdom for operational training and squadron service with the Royal Air Force Volunteer Reserve (RAFVR).

Singh later played a significant role in planning and overseeing the air operations during the Indo-Pakistani War of 1971.

== Early life and education ==
Shivdev Singh was born on 20 December 1919.

== Military career ==
=== Second World War ===
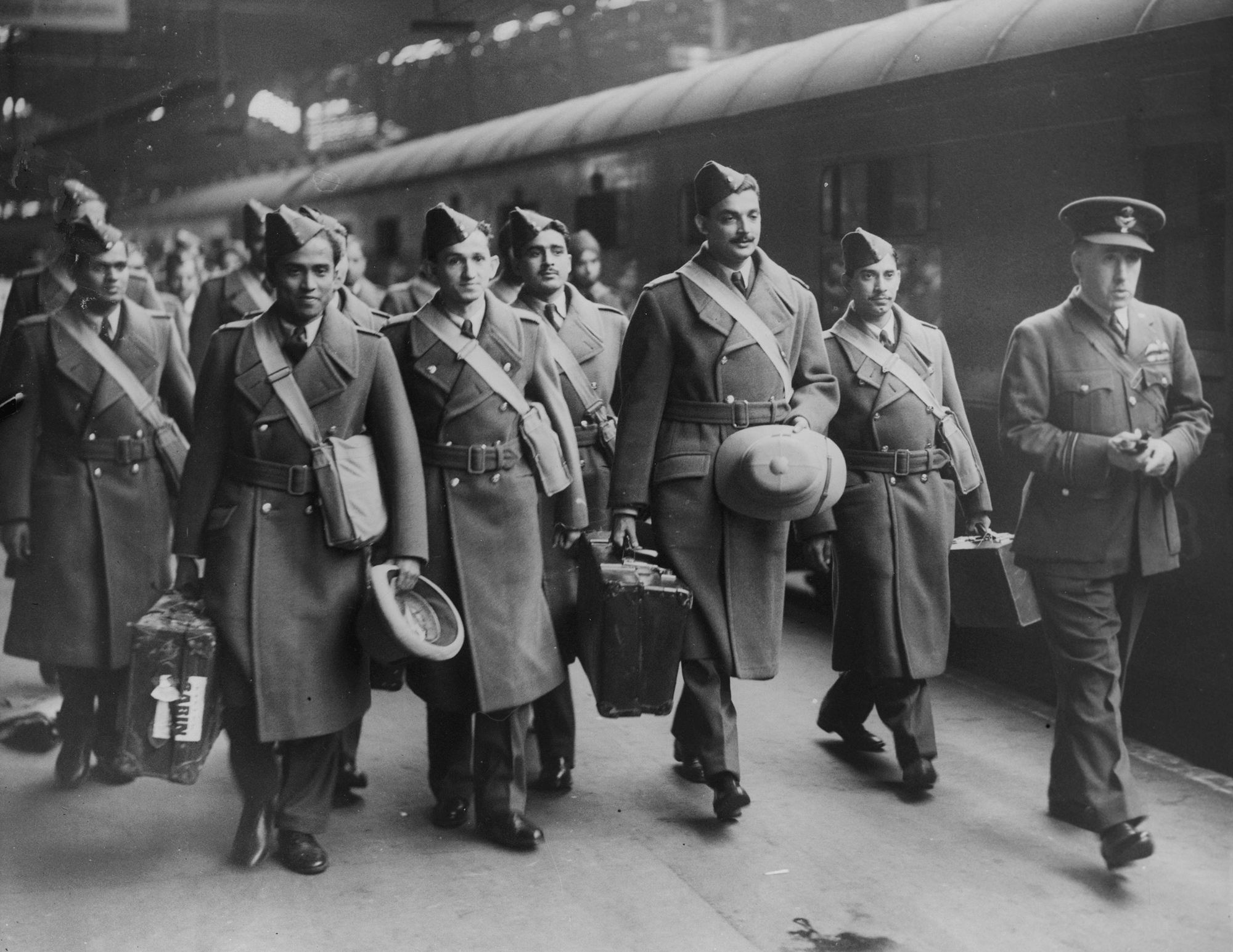
Indian pilots arrival at a London train station, 1940

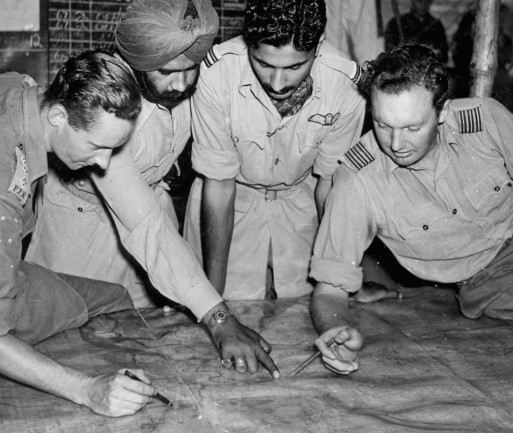
Squadron Leader Shivdev Singh, second from left, flanked by a British Indian Army officer, while Flight Lieutenant Asghar Khan, third from the left, is flanked by a Wing Commander during a mission planning session, World War II, 1945

During the Second World War, Singh was among the first 24 Indian pilots selected from the Indian Air Force's 4th Pilot's Course to be seconded to the United Kingdom for operational training and squadron service with the Royal Air Force Volunteer Reserve (RAFVR). From 12 July 1941 to 23 December 1941 he was squadron pilot to RAF Harwell.

Singh was commissioned as a flight officer on 1 February 1942. As a bomber pilot, he flew 22 operational missions over Germany. He was appointed co-pilot to Drummond Wilson, serving with him on one raid in a Short Stirling. In March 1942 he transferred to RAF Middle East Command. From there, he was subsequently posted to Egypt.

During the Burma campaign (1944–1945) in March 1945 Singh, then in No. 3 Squadron IAF, led a large wing formation flight over Japanese-occupied Burma, contributing to the capture of Rangoon in May 1945. After 18 months in Burma he was reassigned to New Guinea. He served as the Commanding Officer of No. 12 Squadron in Agra from 6 December 1946.

=== Post independence ===
Singh was appointed as the Station Commander of 4 Wing in Agra from 15 August 1947 to mid-October 1948. Throughout April 1951 he attended the Royal Air Force Staff College in Andover, UK. Following this, he served as the Air Advisor at the High Commission of India in London from November 1948 to late-April 1950. Upon returning to India, he was the Station Commander at Air Force Station Jalahalli, Bengaluru, from June 1951 to the end of January 1953. He then served as the Senior Air Staff Officer at Operational Command in Delhi from 25 January 1953 to 1 September 1954.

Singh was appointed Director of Organisation at Air Headquarters in Delhi from early March 1955 to the end of May 1958. He was the Air Officer Commanding of No. 1 Operational Group (Eastern Air Command) in Calcutta from 27 May 1958 to early December 1959, and later the Air Officer Commanding of Advance Headquarters, Operational Command in Simla from January 1960 to January 1963. He then served as the Air Officer Commanding-in-Chief of Eastern Air Command in Calcutta from January 1963 to 9 June 1963, Central Air Command in Calcutta from June 1963 to March 1966, and Western Air Command in Delhi from March 1966 to the end of July 1969. He was awarded the Param Vishisht Seva Medal (PVSM), the highest Indian military medal, in the 1968 Republic Day military awards list.

From July 1969 until his retirement on 31 March 1973, Singh served as the Vice Chief of Air Staff at the Indian Air Force Headquarters in Delhi. During this period, he played a key role in planning and managing air operations in the Indo-Pakistani War of 1971. After retirement, he was appointed as the Commodore Commandant of No. 12 Squadron in June 1976.

== Death ==
Singh died on 29 December 1993.
