= Ram Nath Chawla =

Indian aircraft pilot

Wing Commander Indian Air Force

Personal details
- Born: 1 December 1903 Kasur, Punjab Province, British India
- Died: 23 February 1986

Military service
- Allegiance: British India (1933–1947); India (from 1947)

Ram Nath Chawla (1 December 1903 – 23 February 1986) was an Indian pilot who in March 1930, in an attempt to win a flying competition set by the Aga Khan, was the first Indian to fly an aircraft from India to England. He was the main pilot of a de Havilland Gipsy Moth and was accompanied by 17-year-old Aspy Merwan Engineer, his co-pilot. The journey took 17 days.

He was later commissioned into the equipment branch of the Indian Air Force, becoming its senior officer, before he retired in 1953.

== Early life ==
Ram Nath Chawla was born 1 December 1903. After completing High School in Kasur, he studied civil engineering at the University of Nottingham and took flying lessons at the nearby Hucknall Aerodrome. In 1928, he received his flying licence from the Aero Club of London.

== Family ==
Ram Nath Chawla was fourth among five brothers. His family consisted of his wife, one daughter, Bimla Khetarpal (Chawla being her maternal surname), and two sons, Jung Bahadur Chawla and Avtar Chawla. He lived in small town called, Kasur, now in Pakistan before partition of India but had to leave all their belongings in Pakistan (like millions of others) when the partition of India took place.

== Early flying career ==
In November 1929, keen on promoting aviation, the Aga Khan, 48th Iman of the Ismailai sect of Muslims, announced a £500 prize for the first Indian to fly solo between India and England, in either direction, within a one-month time frame.

Unable to cover the cost of participating, Chawla teamed up with 17-year-old Aspy Merwan Engineer, who had recently received his flying licence and a de Havilland Gipsy Moth aircraft as a birthday gift. On 3 March 1930, with Chawla as the main pilot, they both flew the aircraft from Karachi, to Croydon Airport, England, taking 17 days. After losing their way a number of times, they were received at Croydon by a welcoming crowd and presented with garlands of flowers by the Mayor of London and rewarded with 7,500 rupees from the Indian government. Members of the Punjab Association and officials from the Air Ministry were also present.

On 27 March 1930, The Wallington and Carshalton Times captured the arrival at Croydon with a photograph of both pilots and the headline "From India's coral strand". Under the image were the words "Victor’s laurels".

A reception was held on 10 April 1930. Aspy Engineer shortly returned to Karachi and won the prize, beating J. R. D. Tata by a few hours and winning over Man Mohan Singh due to a technical issue.

The 1965 Who's Who of Aviation Directory of Asia describes Chawla as "the first Indian to pilot an aircraft from Karachi to Croydon, UK in 1930".

== The Aga Khan Award ==
He won the Aga Khan Award for the first Indian to make a flight to and from England to India. Source: https://www.britishpathe.com/video/from-india-in-17-days.

== Later flying career ==
In 1934, Chawla flew from India to England, solo, in a de Havilland Puss Moth.

On 1 August 1940, following training at PAF Base Faisal, Karachi, he was commissioned into the Royal Air Force as an equipment officer. After the partition of India, Chawla became the senior most equipment officer in the Indian Air force. He retired as a wing commander in 1953 and logged 960 hours as a civilian pilot.

== Death ==
Chawla died on 23 February 1986.
