= Drummond Wilson =

- Born: 6 February 1914; Kilmarnock, Scotland
- Died: 11 April 1942 (aged 28); Godmanchester, Cambridgeshire

Matthew Drummond Henderson Wilson, also known as Jock, (6 February 1914 – 11 April 1942) was a British Royal Air Force pilot, who carried out raids on Brest and the Ruhr during the Second World War.

== Early life and education ==
Drummond Wilson was born on 6 February 1914 in Kilmarnock, Scotland, to Matthew Wilson and his wife Elizabeth Davidson Wilson, who died in childbirth. Wilson was raised by his father and received his early education at Cambusdoon, Ayreshire, followed by studies in Craig Park, Edinburgh, before training as a motor vehicle mechanic with Mssrs A&D Fraser back in Kilmarnock.

== Military career ==
One of his early co-pilots was Shivdev Singh. He carried out raids on Brest and the Ruhr during the Second World War.

== Death and legacy ==
Wilson died on 11 April 1942 in an aircraft crash near Godmanchester, Cambridgeshire, on his return flight from Essen in a damaged Short Stirling. The crew managed to return to England, but during a night time go around at RAF Wyton, the aircraft stalled and crashed. Two crew members were killed and six were injured.

In 2017 an account of his flying career was published in the book Stirling to Essen (the Godmanchester Stirling). In 2022 Godmanchester Town Council named a road after him.
