= Hari Chand Dewan =

Indian Air Force officer (1921–2017)

Air Marshal Hari Chand Dewan PVSM
- Born: 20 September 1921
- Died: 22 August 2017 (aged 95)
- Military career
- Allegiance: British India (1942–1947); India (from 1947)
- Branch: Royal Indian Air Force; Indian Air Force
- Conflicts: World War II; Burma campaign; Indo-Pakistani War of 1971

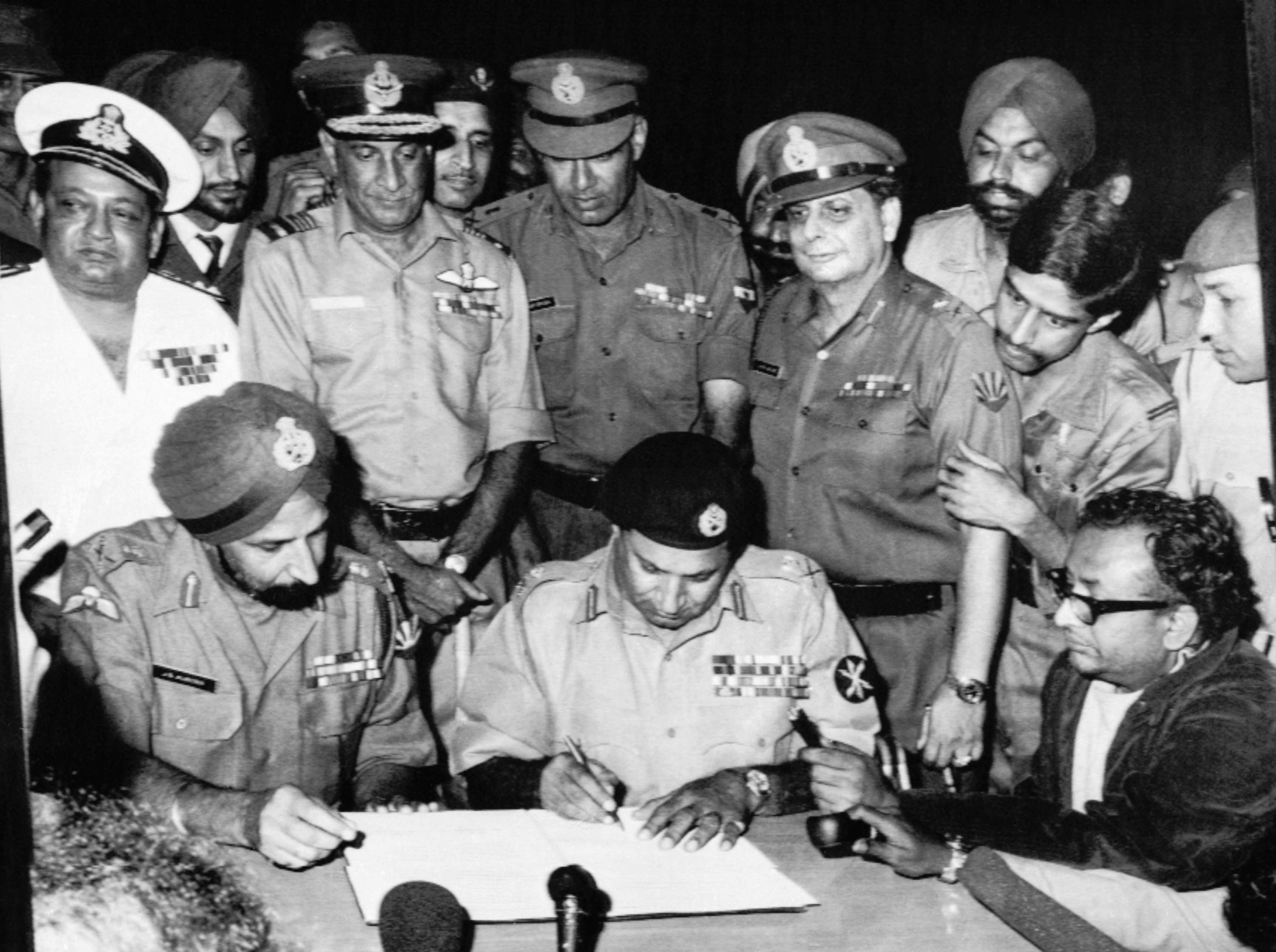
Lt Gen A A K Niazi signing the Pakistani Instrument of Surrender under the gaze of Lt Gen J S Aurora. Standing immediately behind (L-R) Vice Admiral Krishnan, Air Marshal Dewan, Lt. Gen Sagat Singh, Maj Gen JFR Jacob.

Air Marshal Hari Chand Dewan, PVSM (20 September 1921 – 22 August 2017) was an Indian Air Force officer. He was awarded the Padma Bhushan in 1972 for his services at the head of the Eastern Air Command in the Indo-Pakistani War of 1971.

== Career ==
Hari Chand Dewan was born on 20 September 1921. In 1940 he was one of the 24 Indian pilots seconded to the UK. In 1969 he received Param Vishist Seva Medal. He was head of the Eastern Air Command in the Indo-Pakistani War of 1971.

== Death ==
Dewan died in August 2017 at the age of 95.
