= Kenneth Joseph Bhore =

Pakistani transport official

Director-General, Ministry of Transport

Personal details
- Born: 21 October 1912
- Known for: 24 Indian pilots seconded to the UK

Kenneth Joseph Bhore (born 21 October 1912) was a director-general of Pakistan's Ministry of Transport. Earlier in his career, he was one of the 24 Indian pilots seconded to the UK for operational training and squadron service.
