= History of the Indian Air Force =

The Indian Air Force was established on 8 October 1932 independently of the army and navy and in a similar format to the British Royal Air Force. It had been a recommendation of the Skeen Committee, which had been tasked to look into demands for the Indianisation of the Indian army. Its first squadron was raised on 1 April 1933.

== Formation and early pilots ==
Crest of the Royal Indian Air Force (1932–1950)

The Indian Air Force was established in British India as an auxiliary air force of the Royal Air Force with the enactment of the Indian Air Force Act 1932 on 8 October that year and adopted the Royal Air Force uniforms, badges, brevets and insignia. On 1 April 1933, the IAF commissioned its first squadron, No.1 Squadron, with four Westland Wapiti biplanes and five Indian pilots. The Indian pilots were led by RAF Commanding officer Flight Lieutenant (later Air Vice Marshal) Cecil Bouchier.

The first five pilots commissioned into the IAF were Harish Chandra Sircar, Subroto Mukerjee, Bhupendra Singh, Aizad Baksh Awan and Amarjeet Singh. A sixth officer, J N Tandon had to revert to logistics duties as he was too short. All of them were commissioned as Pilot Officers in 1932 from RAF Cranwell. Subroto Mukerjee later went on to become the IAF's first Chief of the Air Staff. Subsequent batches inducted before World War II included Aspy Engineer, K K Majumdar, Narendra, Daljit Singh, Henry Runganadhan, R H D Singh, Baba Mehar Singh, S N Goyal, Prithpal Singh and Arjan Singh.

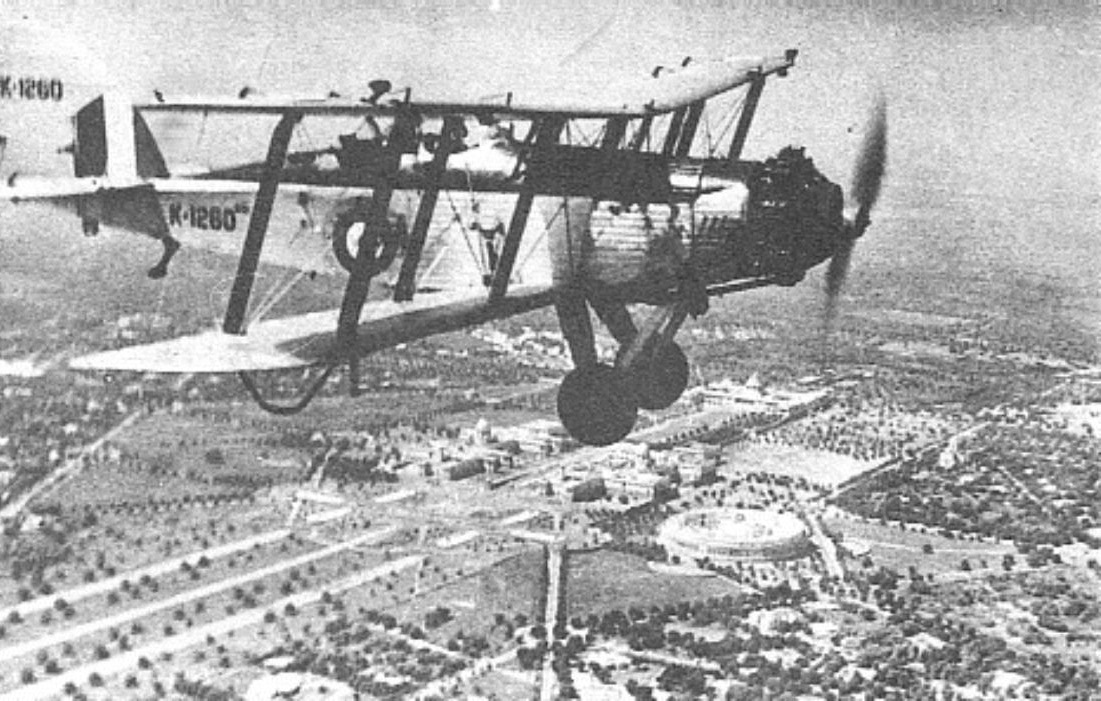
A Westland Wapiti, one of the first aircraft of the Indian Air Force.

== World War II (1939–1945) ==
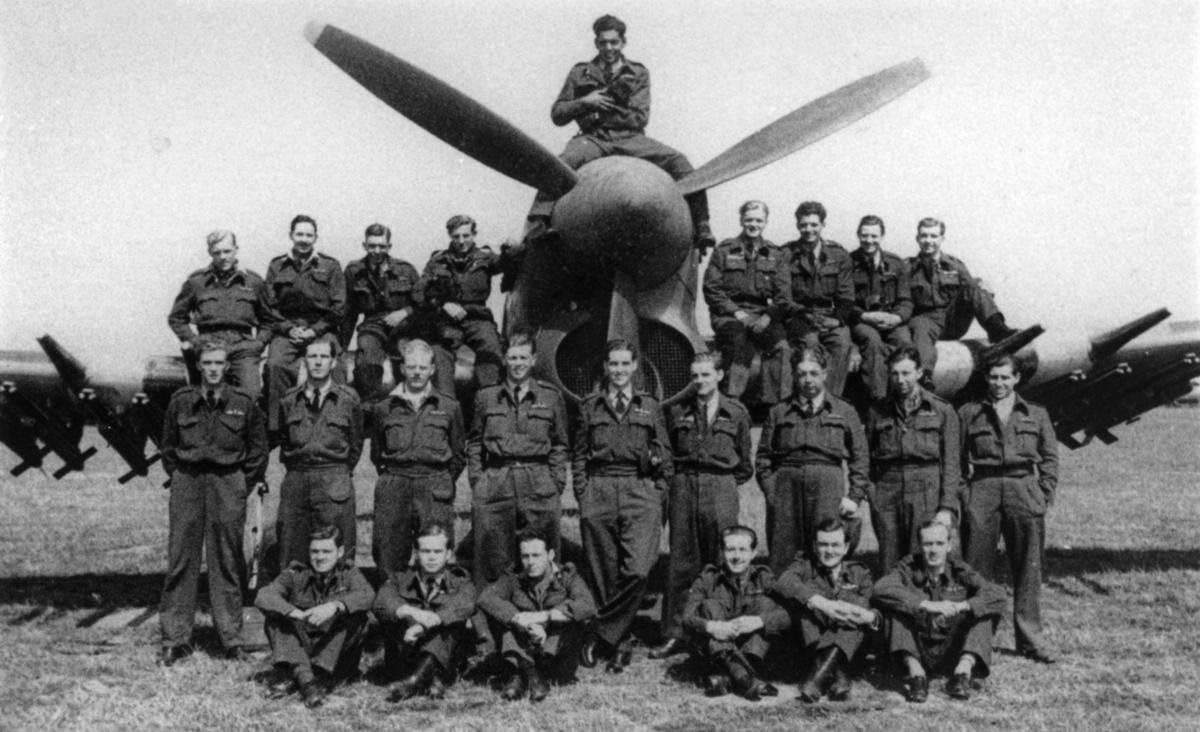
Pilots of No. 263 Squadron pose in front of their Typhoon. Pilot Officer Thyagarajan, an Indian pilot is seated on the engine cowling

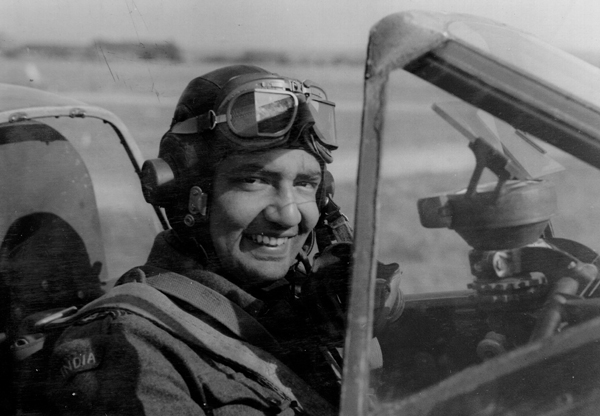
Karun Krishna "Jumbo" Majumdar was the first Indian officer to be awarded the Distinguished Flying Cross.

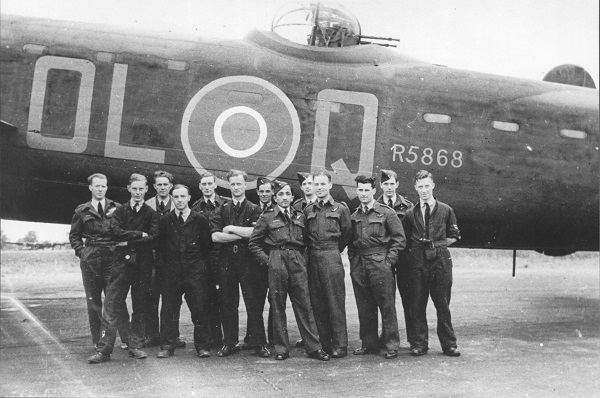
83 Squadron aircrew in front of their Lancaster R5868, Squadron Leader Shailendra Eknath Sukthankar, an Indian Navigator stands in the middle.

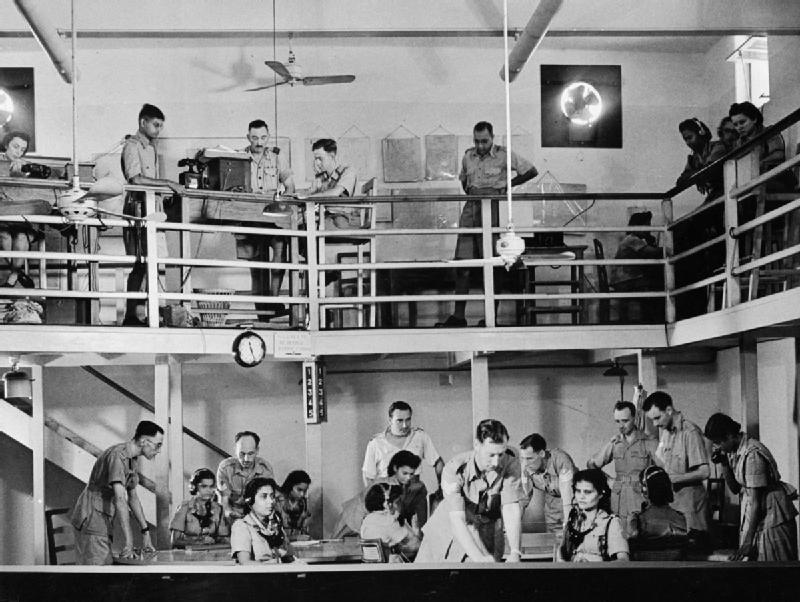
Personnel of the RAF, Indian Air Force and Women's Auxiliary Corps (India) at work in the Operations Room at a Group Headquarters in North-eastern India.

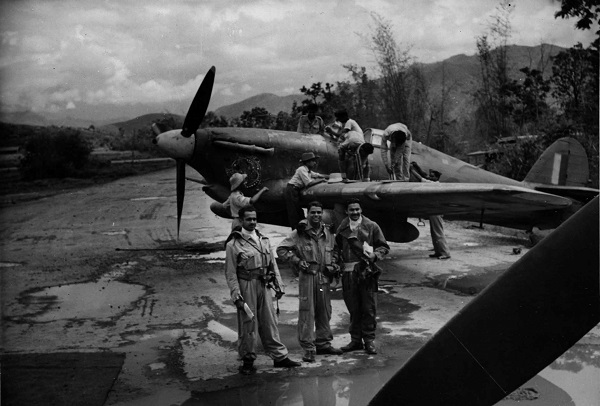
Indian Airforce Pilots after a mission in Burma during WW2

During World War II, the IAF played an instrumental role in halting the advance of the Japanese army in Burma, where the first IAF air strike was executed. The target for this first mission was the Japanese military base in Arakan, after which IAF strike missions continued against the Japanese airbases at Mae Hong Son, Chiang Mai and Chiang Rai in northern Thailand.

The IAF was mainly involved in strike, close air support, aerial reconnaissance, bomber escort and pathfinding missions for RAF and USAAF heavy bombers. RAF and IAF pilots would train by flying with their non-native air wings to gain combat experience and communication proficiency. Besides operations in the Burma Theatre IAF pilots participated in air operations in North Africa and Europe.

In addition to the IAF, many native Indians and some 200 Indians resident in Britain volunteered to join the RAF and Women's Auxiliary Air Force. One such volunteer was Sergeant Shailendra Eknath Sukthankar, who served as a navigator with No. 83 Squadron. Sukthankar was commissioned as an officer, and on 14 September 1943, received the DFC. Squadron Leader Sukthankar eventually completed 45 operations, 14 of them on board the RAF Museum's Avro Lancaster R5868. Another volunteer was Assistant Section Officer Noor Inayat Khan a Muslim pacifist and Indian nationalist who joined the WAAF, in November 1940, to fight against Nazism. Noor Khan served bravely as a secret agent with the Special Operations Executive (SOE) in France, but was eventually betrayed and captured. Many of these Indian airmen were seconded or transferred to the expanding IAF such as Squadron Leader Mohinder Singh Pujji DFC who led No. 4 Squadron IAF in Burma.

During the war, the IAF experienced a phase of steady expansion. New aircraft added to the fleet included the US-built Vultee Vengeance, Douglas Dakota, the British Hawker Hurricane, Supermarine Spitfire, Bristol Blenheim, and Westland Lysander.

Subhas Chandra Bose sent Indian National Army youth cadets to Japan to train as pilots. They went on to attend the Imperial Japanese Army Air Force Academy in 1944.

In recognition of the valiant service by the IAF, King George VI conferred the prefix "Royal" in 1945. Thereafter the IAF was referred to as the Royal Indian Air Force. In 1950, when India became a republic, the prefix was dropped and it reverted to being the Indian Air Force.

Post war, No. 4 Squadron IAF was sent to Japan as part of the Allied Occupation forces.

== Partition of India (1947) ==
With the partition of the Indian sub-continent into two separate nations—India and Pakistan—the military forces were also partitioned. This gave a reduced Royal Indian Air Force and a new Royal Pakistan Air Force in 1947.

== First Kashmir War 1947 ==
In a bid to gain control of the erstwhile princely state of Jammu and Kashmir, Pathan tribesmen poured into Kashmir on 20 October 1947, aided by the Pakistani Army. Incapable of withstanding the armed assault in his province, the Maharaja of Kashmir, Hari Singh, asked India for help. The Government of India made its assistance conditional upon Kashmir's accession to India. The Instrument of accession was signed on 26 October 1947 and the next day Indian troops were airlifted into Srinagar. The agreement was later ratified by the British.

Taking off from Safdarjang, then known as Willingdon Airfield, the IAF landed Indian troops at Srinagar airfield at 09:30 hours IST on 27 October. This was the most instrumental action of the war as the troops saved the city from the invaders. Apart from the airlifting operations and supplying essential commodities to the ground troops, the Indian Air Force had other offensive roles to play in the conflict. Photo reconnaissance, bombing, strafing and interdiction roles were carried out extensively. Excerpts from logbooks of a fighter pilot: 01 Dec 1947 - "TAC/R: Ankur, Bhimber, Mirpur (D'Cruz Pranged - Believed to have been taken as Prisoner of War…Came back just before cease fire)", 18 Dec 1947 - "Border Recee: Ranbirsinghpura-Sambha Area", 31 Dec 1947 - "TAC/R - Bombing. Mirpur, Bhimbar, Jhangal, Naoshara, Berry Pattan", 01 Jan 1948 - "Msg drop at Punch", 12 Sep 1948 - "Baptiste bought it over Tithwal on 12th Sept. Shot down by enemy machine gun", 03 Oct 1948 - "Air Strike Pandu: 8 rockets, Wright bailed out - shot down by Ack/Ack Gun", 04 Oct 1948 and 13 Oct 1948 - "C/S - Tithwal 8 rockets", 25 Oct 1948 - "Air Strike - Skardu Fort (8 rockets)", 26 Oct 1948 - "Air Strike - Nausadda (2-1000 lb bombs)", 27 Oct 1948 - Close Support - Zojila (8 rockets) and Air Strike - Zojila (2-500 lb bombs)", 29 Oct 1948 - "Close Support - 161 Bde (Chakothi Area) 2-250 lb bombs", 03 Nov 1948 - "Air Strike - Biari Area (2-500 lb bombs) and Off/Recce: Dras Area (8 Rockets)", 04 Nov 1948 - "Off/Recce: Dras Area (8 Rockets)", 05 Nov 1948 - "Off/Recce: Dras 77 Bde (8 Rockets)", 06 Nov 1948 - "Air Strike - Chilas (8 Rockets)", 07 Nov 1948 - "Air Strike - Pandu (8 Rockets) and Off/Recce - Dras (8 Rockets)", 13 Nov 1948 - "Off/Recce - Chilas & Gilgit (2-250 lb bombs)', 14 Nov 1948 - "Close Support - Dras (2-500 lb bombs) and Close Support - Dras, Leaflet Drop - Kargil (8 rockets)", 18 Nov 1948 - "Close Support - Tithwal (8 rockets)". These are just some sorties flown in Harvard and Tempest aircraft.

On 31 December 1948, both nations agreed to a UN mediated cease-fire proposal marking the end of hostilities. A Line of Control has since separated Indian-held Kashmir from Pakistani-held Kashmir.

== Congo Crisis (1961) ==
Belgium's 75-year colonial rule of the Democratic Republic of the Congo Congo ended abruptly on 30 June 1960. Unable to control the deteriorating situation in its former African colony, Belgium asked for UN assistance. In India, Prime Minister Jawaharlal Nehru was quick to respond to the initial appeal for help and sent IAF Canberra aircraft as a part of the UN-led mission in Congo.

== Sino-Indian War (1962) ==
In 1962, border disputes escalated into full-scale war between India and China. Indian military and civilian leadership failed to organise and co-ordinate the air assaults efficiently and eventually the Indian Air Force was never used during the conflict apart from occasional supply missions.

== Second Kashmir War 1965 ==
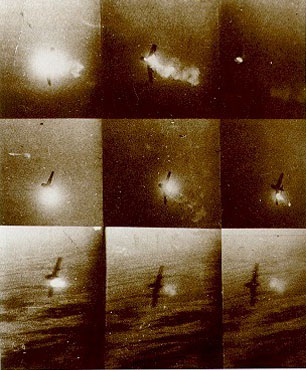
Pakistani Sabre being shot down in combat by an IAF Gnat in September 1965 as seen from the Indian aircraft during the 1965 War.

Three years after the Sino-Indian conflict, India went to war with Pakistan again over Kashmir. Learning from the experiences of the Sino-Indian war, India decided to use its air force extensively during the war. This was the first time the IAF actively engaged an enemy air force. However, instead of providing close air support to the Indian Army, the IAF carried out independent raid missions against Pakistani Air Force (PAF) bases. These bases were situated deep inside the Pakistani territory, making IAF fighters vulnerable to anti-aircraft fire. conflict.

On 1 September 1965, the IAF fighters intervened in an ongoing battle between Indian and Pakistani forces in Chhamb. However, it was inadequate in close air support role. Initially, IAF had sent the obsolete Vampires and later Mystères to stop Pakistani advance. But after incidents of friendly fire, they were not called again for close air support. Two days later, IAF Folland Gnat fighters shot down a PAF F-86 Sabre over Chhamb area. The Gnats were effective against the F-86 and earned the nickname Sabre Slayer. According to one Western source, the Gnats accounted for at least 6 Sabre kills.

During the course of the conflict, the PAF enjoyed qualitative superiority over the IAF because most of the jets in IAF's fleet were of World War II-vintage. Despite this, the IAF was able to prevent the PAF from gaining air superiority over conflict zones. By the time the conflict had ended, Both sides claimed victory in the air war; Pakistan claimed to have destroyed 104 aircraft against its own losses of 19, while India claimed to have destroyed 73 enemy aircraft and lost 35 of its own. Despite the intense fighting, the conflict was effectively a stalemate. More than 60% of IAF's air combat losses took place during the disastrous battles over Kalaikunda and Pathankot. However, the IAF lost most of its aircraft on ground and the attrition rate (losses per 100 sorties) of the IAF stood at 1.49 while PAF's attrition rate was 2.16, because the IAF has larger number of deployed aircraft with higher number of take off and landing sorties.

== Bangladesh Liberation War 1971 ==
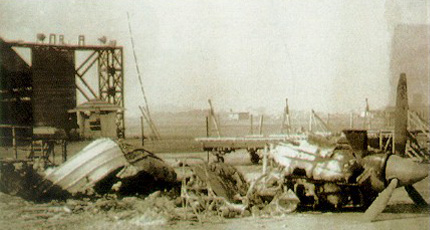
PAF hangar at Dacca airfield after an air attack by the IAF in December 1971

After the 1965 War, the Indian Air Force went through an intense phase of modernisation and consolidation. With newly acquired HF-24, MiG-21 and Sukhoi Su-7BM (though the versions of these acquired between 1965 and 1971 did not have night-fight capability) aircraft, the IAF was able to measure up to the most powerful air forces in the world.

The professional standards, capability and flexibility were soon put to the test in December 1971 when India and Pakistan went to war over (then) East Pakistan. At the time, the IAF was under the command of Air Chief Marshal Pratap Chandra Lal. On 22 November, ten days before the start of a full-scale war, four PAF F-86 Sabre jets attacked Indian and Mukti Bahini positions near the Indo-Bangla border in the Battle of Garibpur. In what became the first ever Dogfight over East Pakistan skies (present day Bangladesh), three of the 4 PAF Sabres were shot down by IAF Gnats, and hostilities commenced. 3 December saw the formal declaration of war following massive, but failed preemptive strikes by the Pakistan Air Force against Indian Air Force installations in the west. The PAF targets were against Indian bases in Srinagar, Ambala, Sirsa, Halwara and Jodhpur on the lines of Operation Focus. But the plan failed miserably as Indians had anticipated such a move and no major losses were suffered. The Indian response over Pakistan skies, however, produced severe blows to the PAF.

Within the first two weeks, the IAF had carried out more than 4,000 sorties in East Pakistan and provided successful air cover for the advancing Indian army in East Pakistan. IAF also assisted the Indian Navy in sinking several Pakistani naval vessels in the Bay of Bengal. In the west, the airforce demolished scores of tanks and armoured vehicles in a single battle – the Battle of Longewala. The IAF pursued strategic bombing by destroying oil installations in Karachi, the Mangla Dam and gas plant in Sindh. As the IAF achieved complete air superiority over the eastern wing of Pakistan within a few days, the ordnance factories, runways, and other vital areas in East Pakistan were severely crippled. In the end, the IAF played a pivotal role in the victory for the Allied Forces leading to the liberation of Bangladesh. In addition to the overall strategic victory, the IAF had also claimed 94 Pakistani aircraft destroyed, with some 45 of their own aircraft admitted lost. The IAF had however, flown over 7000 combat sorties on both East and West fronts and its overall sortie rate numbered over 15000. Comparatively the PAF was flowing fewer sorties (though PAF had qualitative advantage; its Mirage III fighter/bombers could fly at night, where no IAF fighter had that capability—the only aircraft in IAF with this capability was the Canberra bomber) by the day fearing loss of planes. Towards the end of the war, IAF's transport planes dropped leaflets over Dhaka urging the Pak forces to surrender; East Pakistani sources note that as the leaflets floated down, the morale of the Pakistani troops sunk.

== Operation Meghdoot 1984 ==
The Operation Meghdoot was the name given to the preemptive strike launched by the Indian Military to capture most of the Siachen Glacier, in the disputed Kashmir region. Launched on 13 April 1984, this military operation was unique as it was the first assault launched in the world's highest battlefield. The IAF played an important role in the Operation Meghdoot. The IAF Strategic airlifters like the Il-76s, An 12s transported stores and troops, airdropped supplies to high altitude airfields while transport helicopters like Mi-17s, Chetaks transported men and material. The military action was successful as India gained control over all of the Siachen Glacier and all of its tributary glaciers, as well as the three main passes of the Saltoro Ridge. According to 'Time' magazine, India gained more than 1,000 square miles (3,000 km^{2}) of territory because of its military operations in Siachen. Pakistan tried in 1987 and in 1989 to re-take the glacier but was unsuccessful.

== Operation Poomalai (1987) ==
Failing to negotiate an end to the Sri Lankan Civil War, India sent a convoy of unarmed ships to northern Sri Lanka to provide more than 1000 tonnes of humanitarian aid, but it was intercepted by the Sri Lankan Navy and sent back. Following this, the Indian Government decided to carry out an airdrop of the humanitarian supplies on the evening of 4 June 1987 designated Operation Poomalai (Tamil: Garland) or Eagle Mission 4 as a show of force to the Sri Lankan government, of symbolic support to the Tamil rebel and to preserve the credibility of the then Indian Prime Minister Rajiv Gandhi. Five An-32s of the Paratroop Training School in Agra, escorted by five Mirage 2000s of the No. 7 Squadron were to carry out the supply drop. The message was conveyed to the Sri Lankan Ambassador to New Delhi that Indian Air Force would be flying a mission at 1600 Hours to drop supplies over Jaffna. The ambassador was told that the aircraft were expected to complete their mission unhindered and any opposition by the Sri Lankan Air Force 'would be met by force' by the escorting Mirage 2000s. The air drop was a success and the IAF was unopposed by the Sri Lankan forces. Sri Lanka accused India of "blatant violation of sovereignty". India insisted that it was acting only on humanitarian grounds.

== Operation Pawan (1987) ==
The IAF supported the Indian Peace Keeping Force (IPKF) in northern and eastern Sri Lanka. About 70,000 sorties were flown by the IAF's transport and helicopter force in support of nearly 100,000 troops and paramilitary forces without a single aircraft lost or mission aborted. IAF An-32s maintained a continuous air link between air bases in South India and Northern Sri Lanka transporting men, equipment, rations and evacuating casualties. Mi-8s supported the ground forces and also provided air transportation to the Sri Lankan civil administration during the elections. Mi-25s of No. 125 H.U. were utilised to provide suppressive fire against militant strong points and to interdict coastal and clandestine riverine traffic.

== Kargil 1999 ==
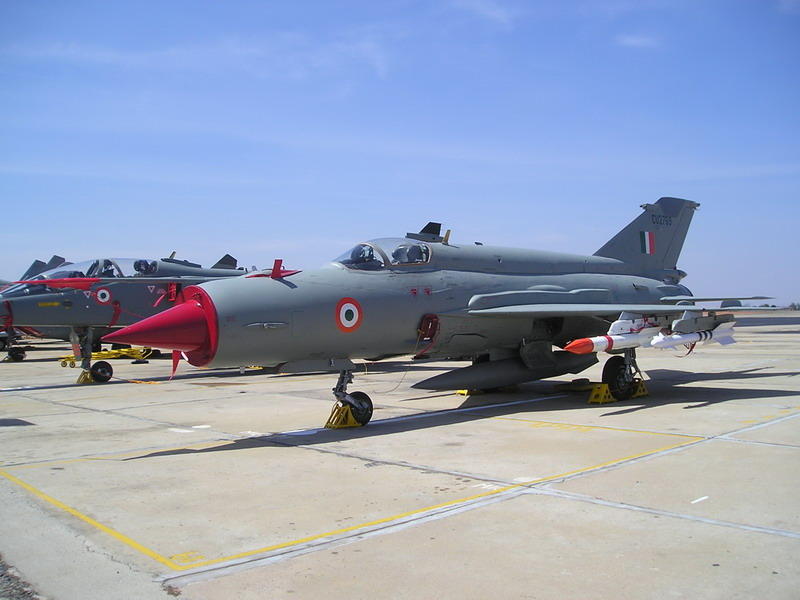
IAF MiG-21s were used extensively in the Kargil war.

On 11 May 1999, the Indian Air Force was called in to provide close air support to the Indian Army at the height of the ongoing Kargil conflict with the use of helicopters. The IAF strike was code named Operation Safed Sagar. The first strikes were launched on 26 May, when the Indian Air Force struck infiltrator positions with fighter aircraft and helicopter gunships. The initial strikes saw MiG-27s carrying out offensive sorties, with MiG-21s and later MiG-29s providing fighter cover. The IAF also deployed its radars and the MiG-29 fighters in vast numbers to keep check on Pakistani military movements across the border. Srinagar Airport was at this time closed to civilian air-traffic and dedicated to the Indian Air Force.

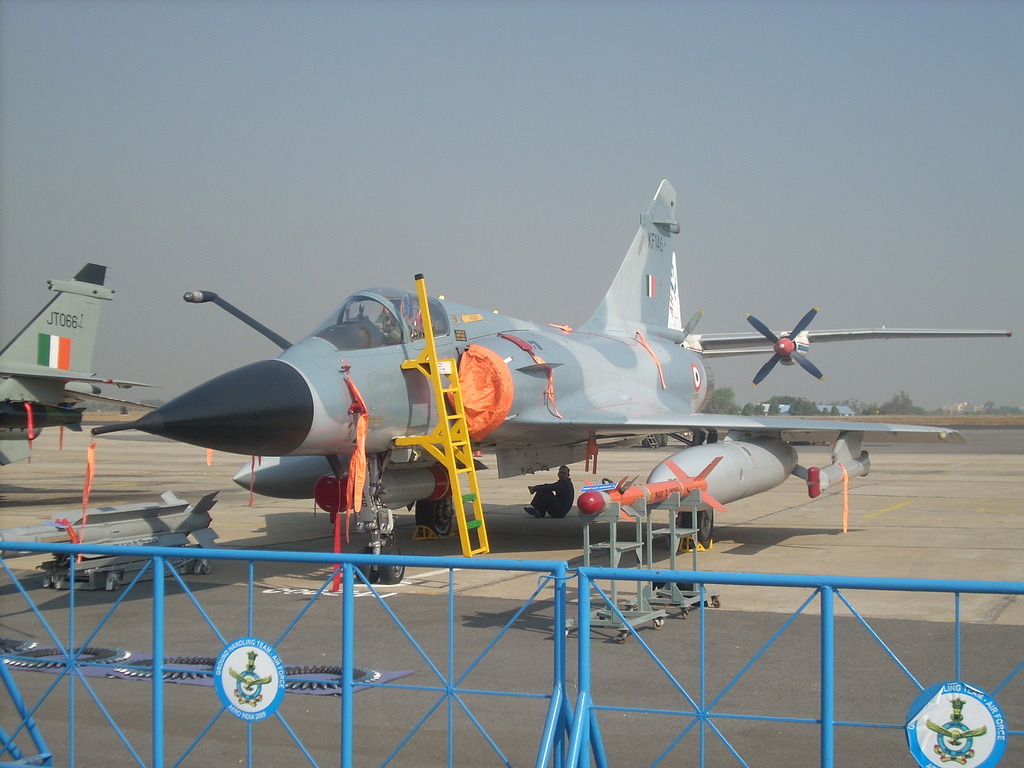
IAF Mirage 2000 became a game changer in the Kargil war

On 27 May, the first fatalities were suffered when a MiG-21 and a MiG-27 jets were lost over Batalik Sector to enemy action and mechanical failure, respectively. The following day, a Mi-17 was lost- with the loss of all four of the crew- when it was hit by three Stingers while on an offensive sortie. These losses forced the Indian Air Force to reassess its strategy. The helicopters were immediately withdrawn from offensive roles as a measure against the man-portable missiles in possession of the infiltrators. On 30 May, the Indian Air Force called into operation the Mirage 2000 which was deemed the best aircraft capable of optimum performance under the conditions of high-altitude seen in the zone of conflict. Mirage 2000s not only had better defence equipment compared to the MiGs, but also gave IAF the ability to carry out aerial raids at night. The MiG-29s were used extensively to provide fighter escort to the Mirage 2000. The Mirages successfully targeted enemy camps and logistic bases in Kargil and within days, their supply lines were severely disrupted. Mirage 2000s were used for strikes on Muntho Dhalo and the heavily defended Tiger Hill and paved the way for their early recapture. At the height of the conflict, the IAF was conducting over forty sorties daily over the Kargil region. By 26 July, the Indian forces had successfully liberated Kargil from Pakistani forces.

== Atlantique incident ==
On 10 August 1999, a Pakistan Navy French-built naval Breguet Atlantic was flying over the Rann of Kutch area and was shot down by two IAF MiG-21 jets killing all 16 aboard.

== See also ==
- Royal Air Force mutiny
- RAF India
