= Jayapal Jayakar =

Indian-English pilot

Jayapal Mukund Jayakar (1912 - 1 January 1981), was the first Indian to receive a commission in the Royal Air Force (RAF). He conducted the 24 Indian pilots seconded to the UK in 1940. He was the son of M. R. Jayakar.
