= Mohinder Singh Pujji =

Indian Royal Air Force fighter pilot

Squadron Leader Mohinder Singh Pujji DFC
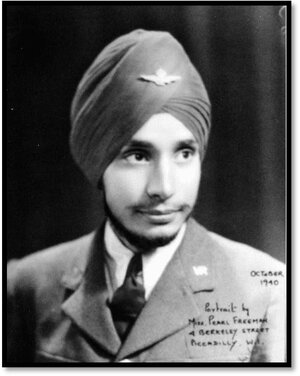
- Mohinder Singh Pujji
- Born: 14 August 1918; Simla, Punjab, British India
- Died: 18 September 2010 (aged 92); Gravesend, England
- Military career
- Allegiance: United Kingdom; British India
- Branch: Royal Air Force; Royal Indian Air Force
- Service years: 1940–1947
- Rank: Squadron Leader
- Service number: Ind/1604
- Units: No. 43 Squadron RAF; No. 258 Squadron RAF; No. 6 Squadron RAF; No. 4 Squadron IAF
- Conflicts: World War II; European theatre; North African campaign; Burma campaign
- Awards: DFC; 1939–45 Star; Air Crew Europe Star; Africa Star; Burma Star; Defence Medal; War Medal 1939–1945; Honorary Freeman of the Borough of Newham
- Other work: Commercial pilot, aerodrome officer

Squadron Leader Mohinder Singh Pujji DFC (14 August 1918 – 18 September 2010), also known as Mahinder Singh Pujji, was a distinguished Royal Air Force fighter pilot and one of the first Indian Sikh pilots to volunteer with the Royal Air Force during the Second World War. He is one of the few Indian pilots to have also served in all three major theatres of the Second World War.

== Early life ==
Mohinder Singh Pujji was born in Simla, British India, on 14 August 1918, the fourth son of Sardar Sohan Singh Pujji and his wife, Sant Kaur. His father was a senior government official who worked in the department of health and education. He attended the Sir Harcourt Butler High School in Simla, then on his father's retirement to his home state of Punjab attended the Government College and later the Hindu College in Lahore. He studied law at Bombay University.

He learned to fly in 1936 as a hobby pilot at the Delhi Flying Club, where he fell in love with flying and in April 1937 achieved his "A" certificate of flying competency. His first job was with Himalayan Airways as a line pilot, flying passengers between Haridwar and Badrinath, but soon after was offered a better job with Burmah Shell, where he worked as a refuelling superintendent in 1938.

Pujji married Amrit Kaur in November 1944. Their first daughter Veena was born in March 1946. The couple had two more children; Rita and Satinder.

== War service ==
In 1940, news of the unceasing German air attacks besieging Britain and civilian losses was reaching British India, Pujji's sense of duty and daring adventurism instinctively caused him to attend the advertised appeal for pre-qualified "A" licensed pilots at the fourth pilot's course of the Royal Indian Air Force—despite his parents' fears; becoming one of the first batch of 24 pre-qualified "A" licensed Indian pilots accepted through this route to receive a Volunteer Reserve commission with the Royal Air Force during the early part of the Second World War.

=== United Kingdom and Europe ===
Embarking for the United Kingdom aboard the troopship Strathallan, arriving in Liverpool on 1 October 1940, Pujji's first posting was on 8 October 1940 to No. 1 RAF Depot in Uxbridge. Within a few days he was posted to No. 12 Elementary Flying Training School RAF at Prestwick in Scotland. From there the first 24 volunteer Indian pilots went on to No. 9 (Pilot) Advanced Flying Unit RAF at RAF Hullavington. From the first 24 volunteer candidates, 18 including Pujji, successfully completed the course and qualified as Royal Air Force pilots, receiving their RAF wings on 16 April 1941. A few weeks later Pujji and a handful of other pilots from the first 24 went on to the renowned No. 56 Operational Training Unit (OTU) at RAF Sutton Bridge, where they joined British and other foreign-allied pilots for advanced fighter pilot training on the Hawker Hurricane.

Pujji flew active service first with No. 43 Squadron RAF from 2 June 1941, the formidable 'Fighting Cocks' fighter squadron, before being posted later in the same month to No. 258 Squadron RAF. Operating from RAF Kenley, Pujji escorted bomber offensives over occupied France, conducted Rhubarb patrols over Europe, coastal patrols and other operational sorties in defence of Britain. He flew mainly Hurricanes, which he preferred to Spitfires, for their relative ease of flying. He was forced down on several occasions; in one instance, his aircraft was disabled over the English Channel by a Messerschmitt Bf 109, but he managed to coax his aircraft to dry land, crashing near the White Cliffs of Dover. He was rescued from the burning wreckage and after a week in hospital returned to duty.

He was treated well in England, experiencing as a volunteer RAF service-member favourable treatment at local cinemas and restaurants, often without payment. He subsequently commented, "I felt very welcome indeed, I never felt different or an outsider and my experiences in this country made me keen to return some time after the War. I was made to feel very much at home by everyone I met" and "I wrote back to my father saying that I did not mind if I was killed because the British people were wonderful and so brave, and I was being so well treated. I could not queue for a movie without being told to move to the front".

As a Sikh, Pujji insisted on retaining his dastar Sikh headwear—even while flying, upon which he had also attached his RAF insignia, even carrying a spare dastar, in case it was needed. The dastar, however, would interfere with use of the pilot flight headgear. On request, he was permitted to use a modified flight headgear, designing a special harness that would permit him to wear the dastar and still use his radio headphone receivers. Pujji's insistence on wearing the dastar inflight meant he could not attach the oxygen mask; it would later cost him an irreparably damaged lung caused by exposure to high-altitude flying. Subsequently, in 1960, he ceased wearing the customary dastar Sikh headwear, "Times changed," he said.

=== Mediterranean and Middle East ===
After serving four months of active service in the European theatre of World War II, Pujji was dispatched at the end of September 1941 to Air Headquarters Western Desert in the Mediterranean and Middle East theatre of World War II. In late 1941, during the North African campaign, his aircraft was forced down in the West African desert, but luckily was found and picked up by British rather than German desert troops. Desert living conditions were somewhat challenging, resulting in Pujji suffering from dietary problems, living often only on hardtack biscuits, since he could not eat the British staple issue service food bully beef for religious reasons, but was compensated by allowing him to fly at weekends to Cairo where he could enjoy a decent meal.

=== South-East Asia ===
On 16 January 1942, Pujji embarked at Suez for Colombo, British Ceylon in the South-East Asian theatre of World War II. From February 1942 through 1943, on transferring to No. 4 Squadron IAF of the Royal Indian Air Force at Kohat, Pujji would fly both the Hurricane and Westland Lysander over the North-West Frontier Province and other locations in British India.

On 20 December 1943, Pujji was dispatched as flight commander to No. 6 Squadron RAF at Cox's Bazar, this time flying the Hurricane in a tactical role, rather than a fighter role, for the RAF Third Tactical Air Force; crucially providing specialist support to the British Fourteenth Army campaign. Pujji served from March 1944 in Burma, where the Japanese posed a threat to British India, moving with the squadron to the Buthidaung region which was the theatre of a major ground offensive. When some 300 US troops were lost without rations, food and radio contact, in the dense Burmese jungle swarming with Japanese soldiers, the US sent out a search party to locate them, however, after the US search party failed after 3-days to locate them, Pujji was personally requested by General William Slim, 1st Viscount Slim of the British Fourteenth Army to find them. Pujji climbed into his plane and in adverse weather flew low over treetops across Japanese occupied territory into the suspected area—and with jubilation for everyone—Pujji found them.

From April 1944, Pujji transferred as flight commander to No. 4 Squadron IAF at Fenny Airfield, carrying out transport escort and merchant shipping escort. In June 1944, No. 4 Squadron IAF transferred to Comilla. With the approaching monsoon season, the role of the squadron was changed from fighter reconnaissance to light bombing, seeing action along the Sangu River during the Third Arakan Offensive. In early 1945, Pujji was transferred on attachment to Command and Staff College in Quetta (then in British India). Pujji had spent almost four years on continuous operational flying duty, considered unusual even by standards of the Second World War.

=== Distinguished Flying Cross ===
For his service bravery over Japanese-occupied territory, Pujji was awarded the DFC, in recognition of gallantry and devotion to duty in the execution of air operations. Announced in The London Gazette on 17 April 1945, and followed with a personal letter of congratulations from Air Chief Marshal Sir Keith Park, the DFC citation reads in part:

Acting Flight Lieutenant Mahinder Singh Pujji No. 4 (RIAF) Squadron

"This officer has flown on many reconnaissance sorties over Japanese occupied territory, often in adverse monsoon weather. He has obtained much valuable information on enemy troop movements and dispositions, which enabled an air offensive to be maintained against the Japanese troops throughout the monsoon. Flight Lieutenant Pujji has shown himself to be a skilful and determined pilot who has always displayed outstanding leadership and courage."

== Post-war life ==
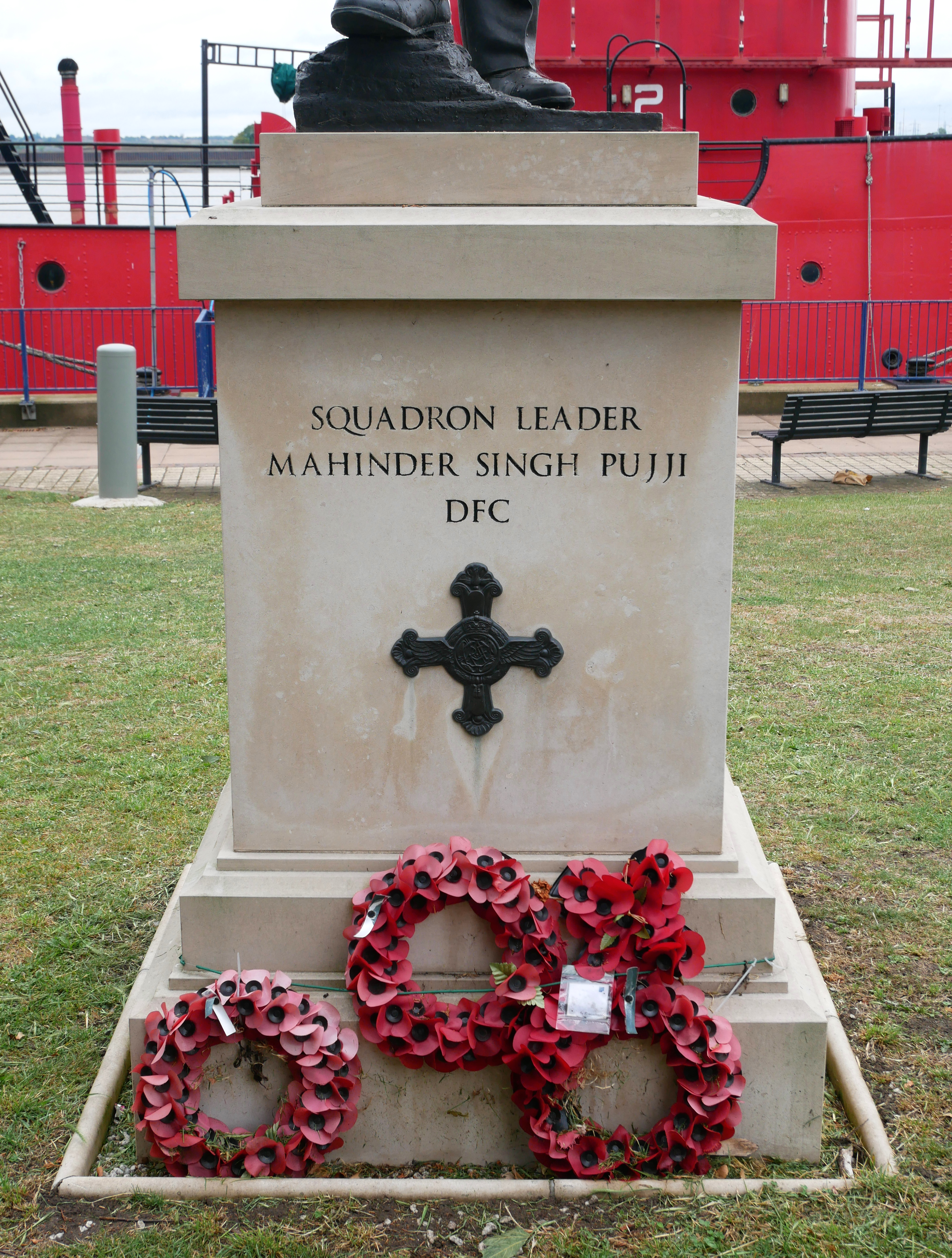
Plinth of Mahinder Singh Pujji Statue at Gravesend

In late 1946, after suffering from a long illness of tuberculosis, which nearly cost him his life, he was classified unfit for military service and received a permanent disability discharge from service in the Indian Air Force. From 1947, Pujji was employed as an Aerodrome Officer at Safdarjung Aerodrome, Delhi, where he also continued to fly in a civilian role. From the 1950s, he went on to aspire as a recreational motor racing champion and holder of gliding records. During his career and life, he had the opportunity to personally give Indian prime minister Jawaharlal Nehru a glider flight tour in 1959, including a glider flight for Edwina Mountbatten, Countess Mountbatten of Burma and US president Dwight D. Eisenhower. In 1961, he had the opportunity to personally greet Queen Elizabeth II on her visit to Udaipur and Jackie Kennedy in 1962.

Pujji returned and emigrated to England in 1974, where he worked as an air traffic controller at Heathrow Airport. Some years later, Pujji moved to the United States to work as manager of a pizza retail chain, before returning to England in 1984 and settling in East Ham, and in 1998 retiring to Gravesend, Kent. On 12 October 2000, he was made an Honorary Freeman of the Borough of Newham.

In 2005, Pujji protested against the British National Party's symbolic usage of a Spitfire aircraft image in their political campaign literature. He was reported as saying,

"The BNP are wrong to use the Spitfire as representative of their party. They forget people from different backgrounds helped in the Second World War. I am proof of this –I was flying a Spitfire. I also met Winston Churchill. Even in those days, there were ethnic minorities fighting for the British. I would recommend the armed forces for young people, regardless of race."

In August 2010, Pujji's autobiography For King And Another Country was released.

Pujji died of a stroke at Darent Valley Hospital, England, on 18 September 2010, aged 92. He is survived by two daughters, one son, seven grandchildren and five great-grandchildren. The local authority, Gravesham Borough Council, celebrated his life and heroism with an exhibition.

== Recognition ==
Despite the high respect that Pujji experienced during the War, he believed that war films presented a "white-only view of the RAF". He campaigned to raise awareness of the Indian contribution to the British war effort, which he, like many veterans, believed had been largely ignored. In 2009, Pujji acknowledged he had received no invitations to any of the many commemorative events in Britain that marked the 70th anniversary of the outbreak of the Second World War, or any other year, he says. He is quoted as saying, "As far as I think, no one in authority remembers that we are here, and we were a part of World War II".

In an effort to redress the balance, the Royal Air Force Museum Cosford opened a permanent exhibition in January 2009 ("Diversity in the Royal Air Force"), intended to "challenge negative perceptions, by celebrating the racial diversity of its history". The museum's curator—Al McLean, is quoted as saying: "Too many of our visitors are white, over 50 and middle class. I want to appeal to more than just those people. This exhibition explains a side of our story that isn't recognised – that the RAF is not just a white public schoolboy occupation". Pujji was the guest of honour at the opening.

Shortly before his death on 18 September 2010 aged 92, Pujji was invited to attend a wreath-laying ceremony by Philip Sidney, 2nd Viscount De L'Isle, at a memorial outside the former RAF Station Gravesend Airport, to commemorate "The Few" on the 70th Anniversary of the Battle of Britain.

In 2011 the short film The Volunteers was dedicated to Pujji after he contributed to its making but died before the film's completion.

=== Statue ===
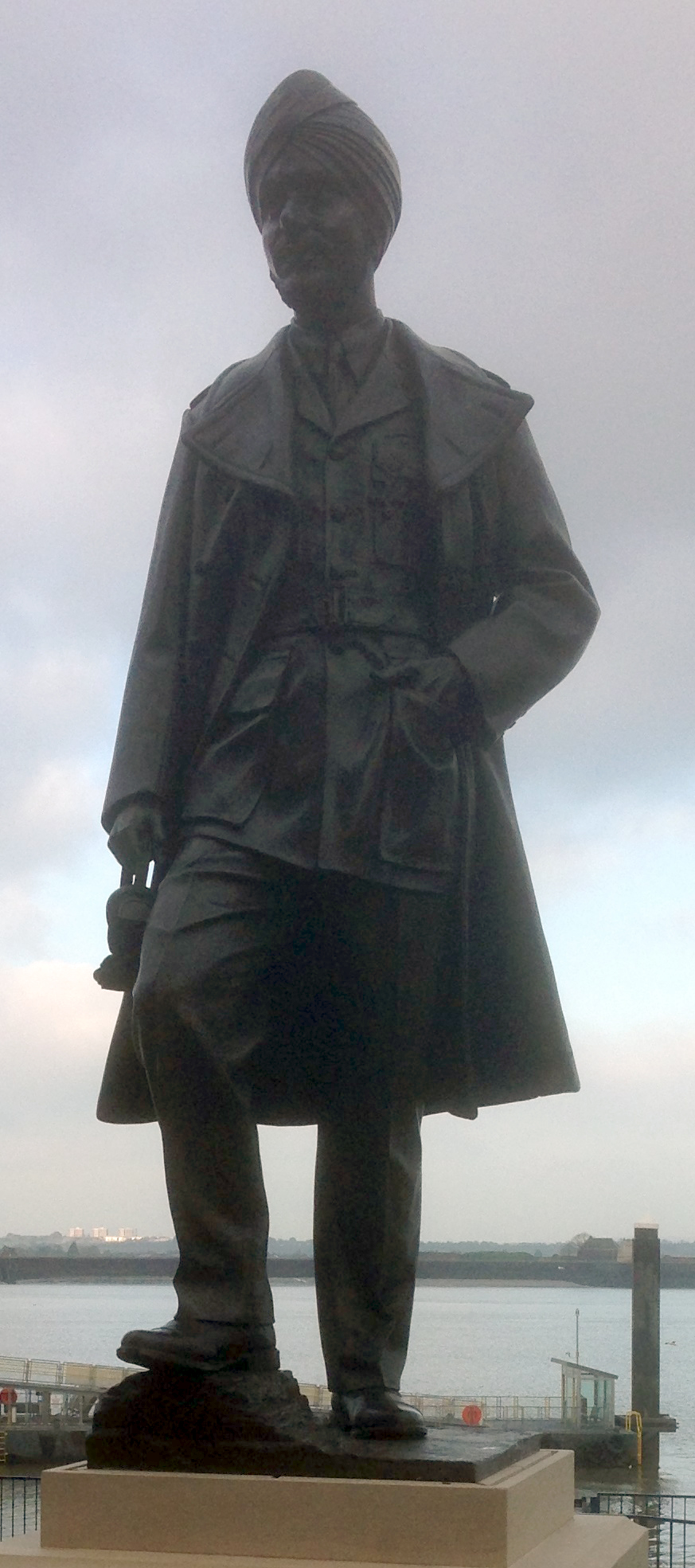
Mahinder Singh Pujji Statue, Gravesend, London

A statue of Pujji, by English sculptor Douglas Jennings, was unveiled by Air Vice-Marshal Edward Stringer in St Andrew's Gardens, Gravesend, on 28 November 2014. It bears the inscription: "To commemorate those from around the world who served alongside Britain in all conflicts 1914-2014". The Gravesend community, which has one of the largest gurdwaras in the UK, raised £70,000 for the statue in a month.
