= Dieppe Canadian War Cemetery =

CWGC cemetery in Seine-Maritime, France

- Commonwealth War Graves Commission
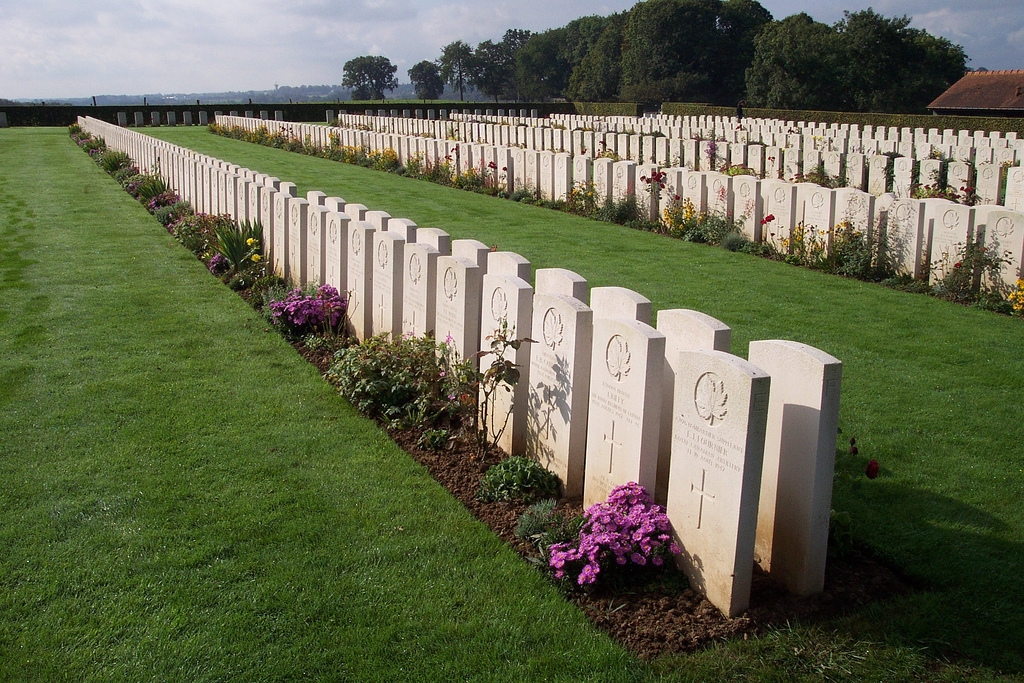
- Used for those deceased 1940-1945
- Established: 1942
- Location: 49°53′45″N 1°4′4″E near Dieppe, France
- Total burials: 948

Burials by nation
- Canada 582; United Kingdom 174; New Zealand 4 Poland 3 Australia 1 India 1 (unidentified 187)

Burials by war
- World War II: 948

Dieppe Canadian War Cemetery is a Second World War military war grave cemetery, located in the village of Hautot-sur-Mer, 5 km (3.1 mi) south of Dieppe in Normandy, France. It contains Canadian and British soldiers killed during the Dieppe Raid on the 18/19 August 1942. This large scale daylight assault on a fortified objective was an abject failure and casualties were very heavy. Of an attacking military force of some 6,100, over 3,600 were killed, wounded, missing or taken prisoner.

765 identified Allied service personnel are interred in the cemetery, of which 582 are Canadian; a further 187 are unidentified. Further casualties from the Dieppe raid are buried in Rouen, where the Germans took captured soldiers, some of whom later died of their wounds. There are seven non-Commonwealth graves and two not from the Second World War.

== History ==
The cemetery is unique in that it was created by the occupying Germans, as the Allied raid was a disaster and many dead were forced to be left behind in enemy territory. The headstones were placed back-to-back in long double rows, typical of German burials but unlike any other Commonwealth war cemetery. When Dieppe was liberated in 1944, the Allies elected not to disturb the graves, so this unusual arrangement remains.

The post-war design was by Commonwealth War Graves Commission (CWGC) architect Philip Hepworth and the cemetery in France was the first CGWC cemetery to be completed in 1949. The cemetery is maintained by the commission.

== Notable interments ==
- Pilot Officer Dastur Rustom Nariman (Royal Indian Air Force) of No. 12 Squadron RAF who was killed over Normandy on 31 August 1941 aged 22.
- Brigadier Mary Janet Climpson, a British Salvation Army Officer, who was killed when her vehicle was strafed by German planes, in 1940.
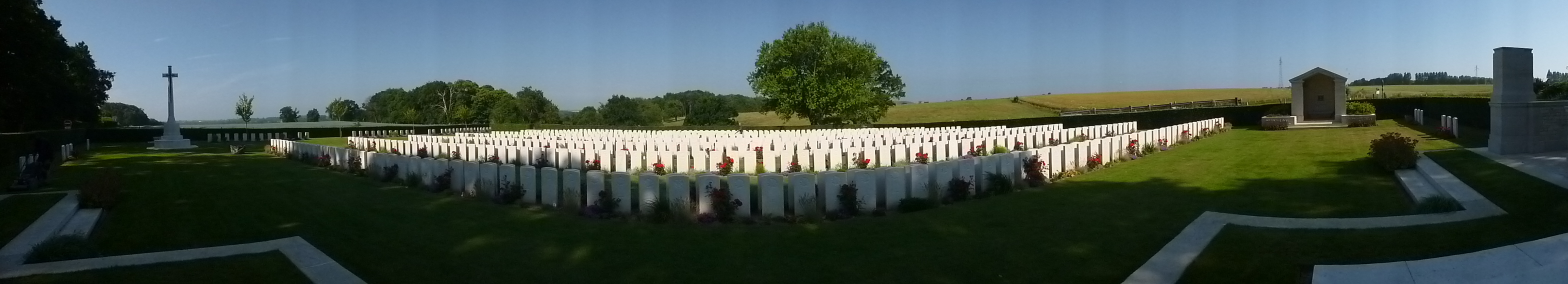
Panoramic photograph of the Canadian War Cemetery in Dieppe.
