= No. 12 Squadron IAF =

No. 12 Squadron Yaks
- Insignia of The No. 12 Squadron IAF "Yaks"
- Active: 1 December 1945- Present
- Country: Republic of India
- Allegiance: Indian Armed Forces
- Branch: Indian Air Force
- Role: Transport
- Garrison/HQ: AFS Agra
- Nickname: "Yaks"
- Mottos: Amit Vikram; Boundless Valour

Aircraft flown
- Transport: Antonov AN-32

No. 12 Squadron nicknamed the Yaks is a unit of the Indian Air Force assigned to the Central Command. The Squadron participates in operations involving air, land and airdrop of troops, equipment, supplies, and support or augment special operations forces, when appropriate.

== History ==
The No. 12 Squadron was raised on 1st Dec 1945 at Kohat, Pakistan. It was the 10th and the last Royal Indian Air Force sqns to be raised. and moved to the present location in Aug 1947. Also known as "The Striking Yaks".

During the Indo-Pakistani War of 1947–48, No. 12 Squadron flew sustained missions from Palam and Srinagar, providing close air support, troop transport, and reconnaissance. It played a decisive role in the defense of Uri and the air operations over the Kashmir Valley.

=== Lineage ===
- Constituted as No. 12 Squadron (Yaks) on 1 December 1945

=== Assignments ===
- Indo-Pakistani War of 1965
- Indo-Pakistani War of 1971

=== Aircraft ===
- Spitfire
- C-47
- AN-32
- Douglas DC-3
