= Darwin Military Museum =

Military museum in East Point, Northern Territory, Australia

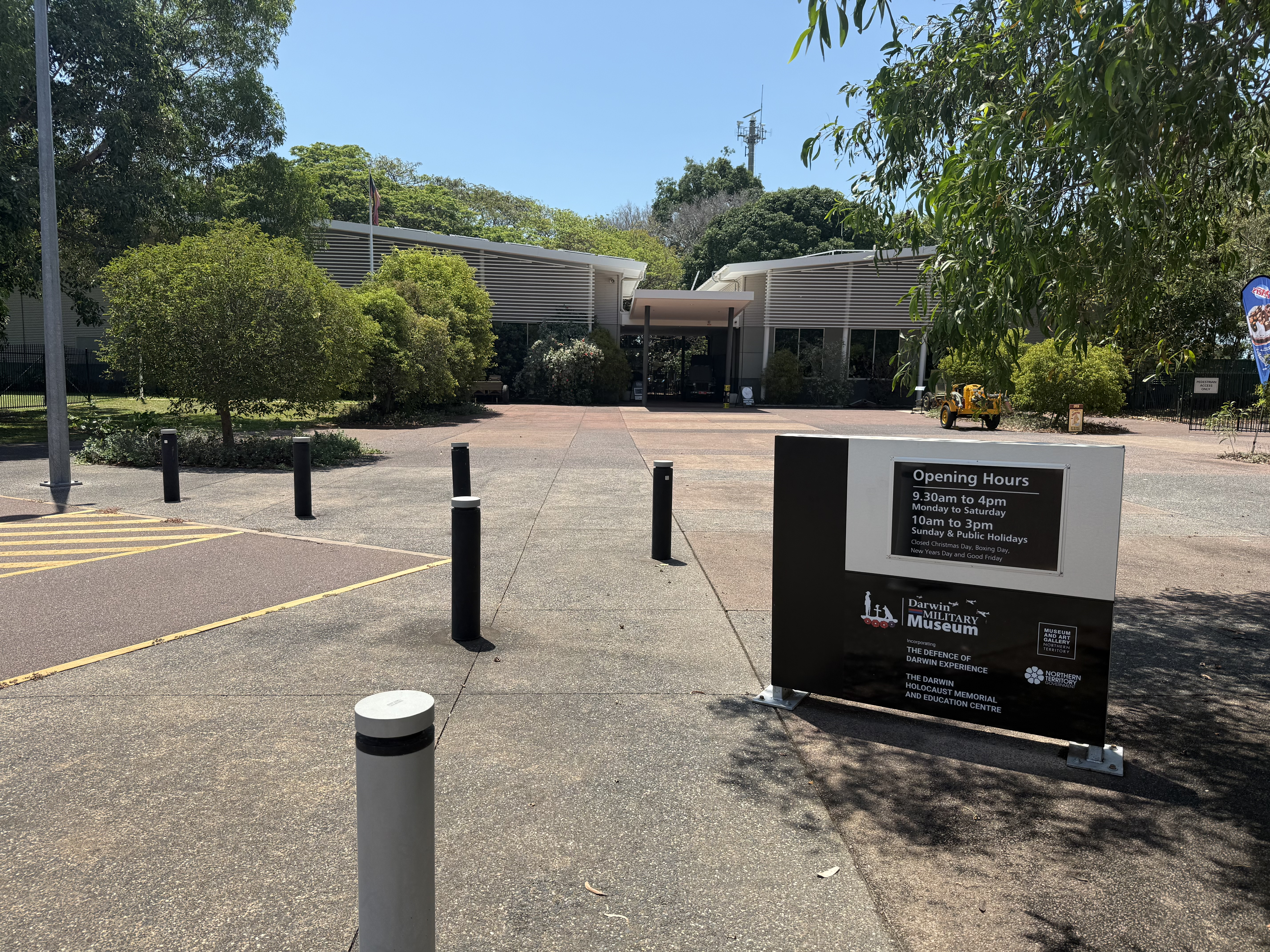
- Darwin Military Museum, September 2025
- Established: 1965
- Location: East Point, Northern Territory
- Coordinates: 12°24′27.06″S 130°49′11.17″E
- Type: Military, War
- Website: www.darwinmilitarymuseum.com.au

The Darwin Military Museum was originally established as an artillery museum by the Royal Australian Artillery Association (NT) Inc (RAAA) to exhibit photographs and artefacts from Darwin's history during World War II. The museum now has a large exhibit of items from the war, including Navy, Army and Air Force items from Australian, US and other armed forces. It is set amongst concrete gun emplacements and other fortifications in an area that was one of the most heavily fortified parts of Australia during the war.

At the peak around 1943, there were over 110,000 armed forces personnel based in Darwin and nearby areas. It was from Darwin that General Douglas MacArthur launched his campaign to liberate Manila and more generally to reclaim the Philippines from Japanese occupation.

During the war, Darwin was bombed 64 times over almost two years, with the first two raids alone on 19 February 1942 resulting in the deaths of an estimated 243 people. Other sources place the figure as much higher, even up to 1000, and a memorial plaque on the Darwin Esplanade overlooking the harbour says 292 people were killed. ABC TV News on 28 February 2010 carried an item saying that the Darwin City Council has commissioned naval historian John Bradford to determine the truth on how many died.

== History ==
The museum was begun out of the wreckage of East Point fortifications in the 1960s by the RAAA (NT), specifically by fencing off an area around the 9.2-inch gun Command Post. Two six-inch guns which were being vandalised in their sites further away on the foreshore were brought inside the fence. Trees and a garden were planted. The RAAA steadily added to its collection of AA guns, vehicles, and items such as weapons and uniforms. Over the years the museum grew from a once-a-week opening to weekends, and then moved towards a seven-day-a-week timetable. Concurrently it installed a series of managers. From 2009 the RAAA took over operating the museum directly. The present operation has an eight-person management board and employs a number of staff as admissions attendants.

Prior to the 2008 territory elections, the Northern Territory Government announced that it had allocated over A$10 million in funds to be spent on various projects for the museum.

In July 2009, East Point Military Museum was renamed as Darwin Military Museum. The Northern Territory Government and the Royal Australian Artillery Association (NT) Inc have worked in collaboration towards an improved site since 2008. Since mid-2009 the RAAA has outlaid approximately $A250,000 on improvements to the site and its collection, including reorienting the focus of the museum towards the 1942 raids, while taking in all Northern Australian defence.
