= Castlehill, Inverness =

Residential area in the east of Inverness

Coordinates: 57.472482°N 4.172609°W

Castlehill, Inverness

Castlehill (Caisteal Still ) is a residential area in the east of Inverness, which is now part of the Cradlehall and Westhill community. This should not be confused with the hill in the city centre that serves as the site of Inverness Castle. Castlehill area is historically associated with the Cuthbert family, a local clan in Inverness-shire.

== History ==
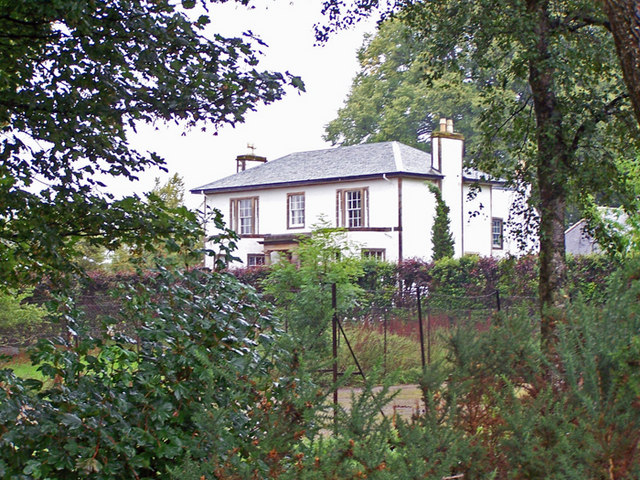
Castlehill House is situated adjacent to Culloden Road at Castlehill, Inverness.

Archaeological investigations at Castlehill, Inverness have identified prehistoric occupation remains, including pits, ceramic material, areas of burning dated to the Neolithic period (roughly 4th millennium BC).

During early and medieval periods, Castlehill including Drakies and Muckovy was under Cuthbert family. According to tradition, the lands of Castlehill were granted to the Cuthbert family by King Kenneth I in the 950s.

Castlehill House is a post-medieval house in the area. The main older part of the house dates probably to the late 18th or early 19th century. No further information regarding it history or relation to the Cuthbert family is available. It is Grade B listed building.

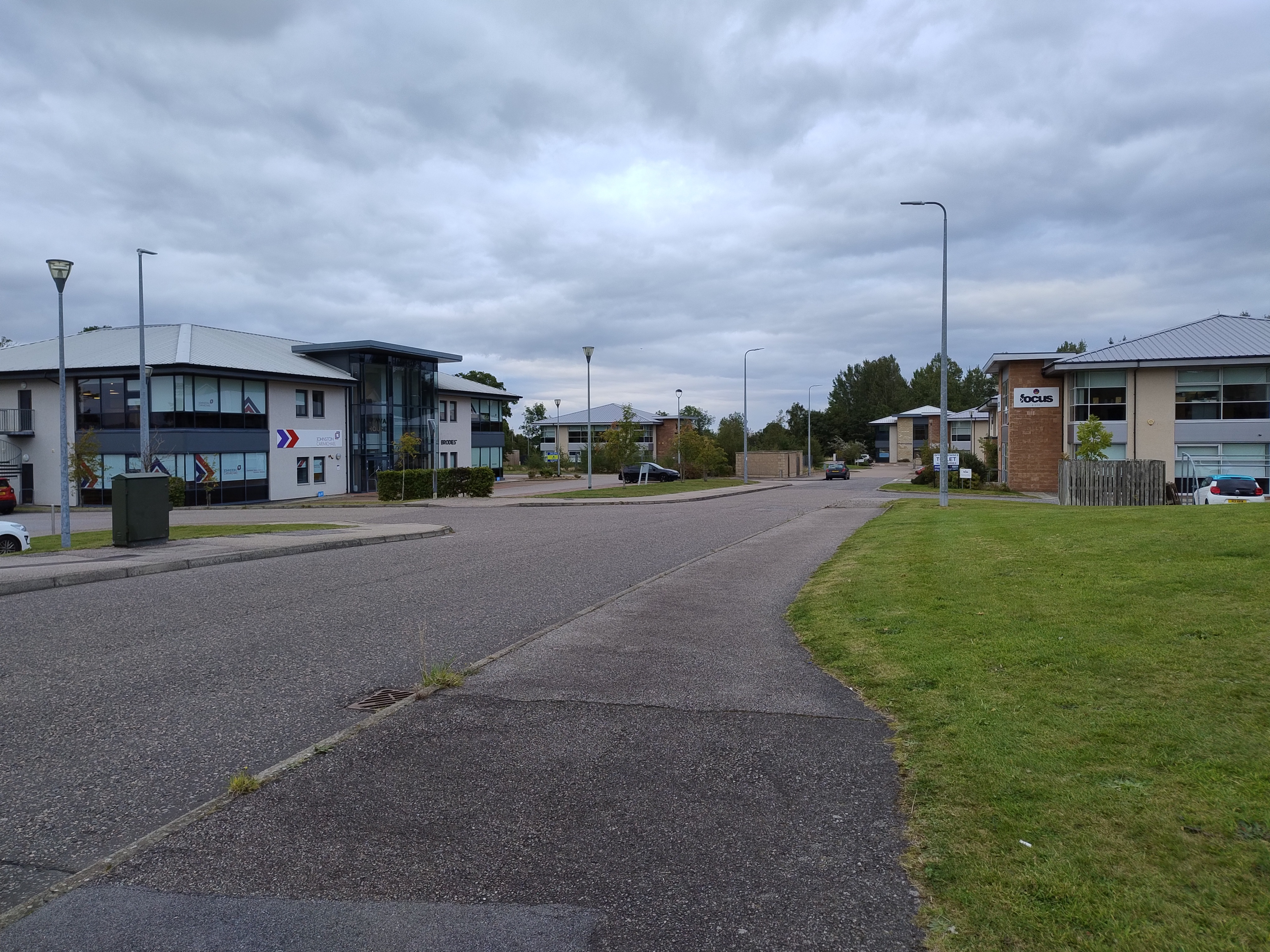
Cardlehall business park, An outside view showing a group of office buildings

== Present day ==
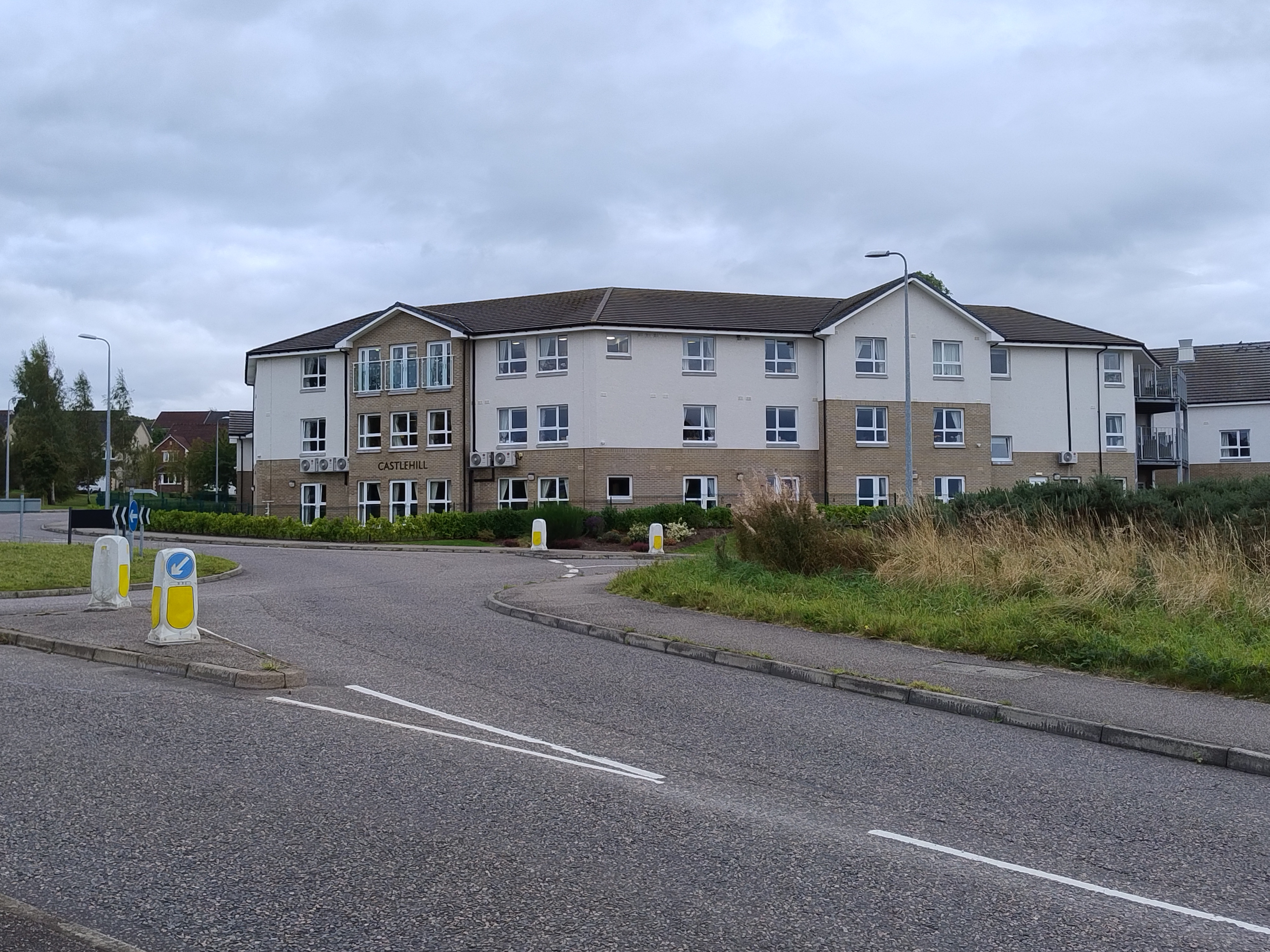
Castlehill Care home, a view from outside, Sep 2025

Castlehill is now primarily a residential area with several modern housing developments. The nearby Cradlehall Business Park holds a range of local businesses.

=== Castlehill Care Home (Morar Highland) ===
Castlehill Care Home, which is located within Castlehill in Inverness, was registered in December 2019 and is operated by Simply Inverness Ltd, a subsidiary of Simply UK. During 2024–2025, the provider sought to operate the home under the name Morar Highland, which was used as a trading name. In late 2025, the care home was publicly referred to as Morar Highland.

In summer 2025, a BBC investigation reported concerns regarding the standard of care at the facility. Following this, the Care Inspectorate issued a public statement identifying “serious and significant concerns” and served an Improvement Notice. In January 2026, Companies House records show that the operating company reverted its legal name from Morar Highland Ltd back to Simply Inverness Ltd. In response to regulatory action, the provider reported management changes, increased clinical oversight, and announced a refurbishment programme and staffing reforms during late 2025 and early 2026.

== See also ==
Baron of Castlehill
