= SS Fultala =

British merchant steamship

History

United Kingdom
- Name: Fultala
- Owner: British India SN Co
- Port of registry: Glasgow
- Builder: Wm Doxford & Sons, Pallion
- Yard number: 200
- Launched: 4 October 1890
- Completed: November 1890
- Identification: UK official number 98589; code letters LWMB; 1918:call sign GDC
- Fate: scrapped, 1923

General characteristics
- Type: cargo liner
- Tonnage: 4,154 GRT, 2,702 NRT, 5,900 DWT
- Length: 366.0 ft (111.6 m)
- Beam: 48.1 ft (14.7 m)
- Draught: 23 ft 9 in (7.2 m)
- Depth: 26.6 ft (8.1 m)
- Decks: 3
- Installed power: 473 NHP, 2,450 ihp
- Propulsion: 1 × triple-expansion engine; 1 × screw
- Speed: 11 1/2 knots (21.3 km/h)
- Capacity: passengers: 12 × 1st class, 1,667 × deck class
- Notes: sister ship: Fazilka

SS Fultala was a British India Steam Navigation Company (BI) steamship. She was built in England in 1890, operated mostly in the Indian Ocean, and was scrapped in India in 1923. She was a troop ship in the Second Boer War and the First World War. From 1901 to 1906 she took Indian indentured labourers to Fiji.

She was the first of three BI ships to be called Fultala. The second was a motor ship that was built in 1940 and sunk in 1942. The third was a steamship that was built in 1948 and sold in 1961.

== Building ==
In 1890 William Doxford & Sons at Pallion in Sunderland built a pair of sister ships for BI. Yard number 199 was laid down on 12 May 1890, launched on 17 August as Fazilka, and delivered on 11 October. Yard number 200 was launched on 4 October as Fultala, and completed that November.

Fultala's registered length was 366.0 ft (111.6 m), her beam was 48.1 ft (14.7 m), her depth was 26.6 ft (8.1 m) and her draught was 23 ft 9 in (7.2 m). Her tonnages were 4,154 GRT, 2,702 NRT, and 5,900 DWT. She had berths for 12 first class passengers, and was licensed to carry 1,667 unberthed passengers on deck.

Fultala had a single screw, driven by a three-cylinder triple-expansion engine. It was rated at 462 NHP or 2,450 ihp, and gave her a speed of 11 1/2 knots (21.3 km/h).

== Career ==
On 12 November BI registered Fultala at Glasgow. Her United Kingdom official number was 98589 and her code letters were LWMB.

Her maiden voyage was from Britain to Aden. On Christmas Eve, 24 December 1890, she stopped at Gibraltar with engine failure. On 13 September 1897 she suffered a minor collision with the pier at Williamstown, Victoria.

All BI ships were designed to be converted into troop ships, by putting troop accommodation in the holds. In the Second Boer War the UK Government chartered at least 37 BI ships for war service. On 19 January 1900 Fultala left Bombay (now Mumbai) carrying 280 horses supplied by Indian princes, and 103 personnel to look after them: a captain of the 6th Bengal Lancers, a lieutenant of the 5th Bengal Lancers, a veterinary assistant, 25 Indian soldiers, and 74 syces (grooms). On 12 or 13 February she reached Cape Town.

In 1901 Fultala took troops to Kismayo in Jubaland, which at that time was part of Britain's Kenya Colony. From 1901 to 1906 she made four voyages taking Indian indentured labourers to Fiji, as shown in the table below.

Fiji voyages
Voyage Number	Date of Arrival	Number of Passengers
I	12 May 1901	809
II	10 April 1905	827
III	17 August 1905	790
IV	28 April 1906	801

Fultala was a troop ship in the First World War. In September 1914 she carried part of the 3rd (Lahore) Division from Bombay to Marseille. In June 1917 she came under the Liner Requisition Scheme.

By 1918 Fultala was equipped with wireless telegraphy. Her call sign was GDC.

On 15 August 1923 BI sold Fultala for scrap for 60,000 rupees. She was broken up at Bombay.

== See also ==
- List of Indian indenture ships to Fiji

== Bibliography ==
- Haws, Duncan (1987). British India S.N. Co. Merchant Fleets. Vol. 11. Burwash: Travel Creatours Ltd Publications. ISBN 0-946378-07-X.
- Lloyd's Register of British and Foreign Shipping. Vol. I.–Steamers. London: Lloyd's Register of Shipping. 1891 – via Internet Archive.
- The Marconi Press Agency Ltd (1918). The Year Book of Wireless Telegraphy and Telephony. London: The Wireless Press, Ltd.
- Mercantile Navy List. London. 1891 – via Crew List Index Project.
