= Baron of Muirton =

Title of nobility in the Baronage of Scotland

- Creation date: 1532
- Creation: Baronage of Scotland
- Created by: James V of Scotland
- First holder: Abbott Robert Reid
- Present holder: Dr. Richard Culbert of Muirton, Baron of Muirton
- Heir apparent: Cailin Culbert, Maid of Muirton
- Remainder to: heirs and assignees whatsoever
- Motto: Gu Gaisgeil
- Arms: Or, a fess fusily azure, in chief a lymphad between two griffins combatant all sable, in base a serpent gliding in pale of the second
- Crest: an armed dexter arm in pale holding two arrows in saltire all proper

Baron of Muirton is a title of nobility in the Baronage of Scotland.

The first known Crown charter was granted in 1532, to Robert Reid, Abbot of Kinloss.

In 2019, the current baron ascended to the title The M. Hon. Dr. Richard Bruce Culbert of Muirton, 32nd Baron of Muirton.

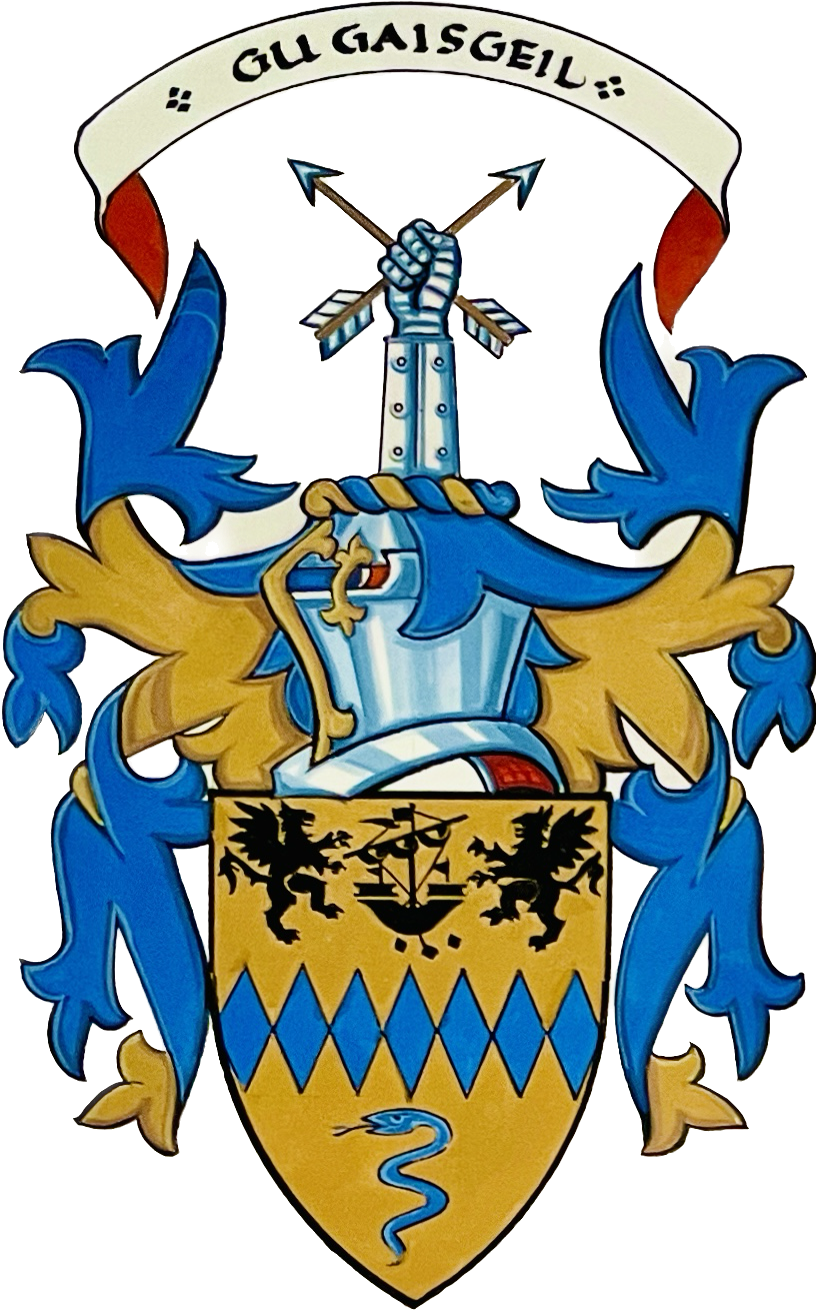
Coat of Arms of current baron

Baronies originated during the Middle Ages and were lands held by barons in feu as "tenants in chief" of the monarch. The baron had the rights to the production of the land and was responsible to maintain law and order in the name of the king. He usually had to provide military forces in times of war, as well. Over time law enforcement and other powers were gradually stripped from barons. In Scotland, the Abolition of Feudal Tenures Act 2000 separated the title of baron from the land becoming a personal title and allowed it to be transferred as an incorporeal hereditament.

== Location ==
The boundaries of the Barony have changed over the years but at one point it included Kinloss Abbey and its lands, the town of Kinloss, the lands and town of Muirton, the towns of Blackstob and Hatton, and the burgh of barony of Findhorn, including the mouth of the Findhorn River and the adjacent coast "lying in the ancient Sheriffdom of Elgin and Forres". This is roughly the area from the ruins of the abbey, to Kinloss Golf Course, to the burgh of Findhorn and encompassing Kinloss Barracks on a modern map.

=== Abbey of Kinloss ===
The Abbey was founded in 1150 by David I for monks of the Cistercian order. The original monks were from Melrose Abbey.(Wiki). The Abbey was granted valuable salmon fishing rights on the Findhorn river by Robert the Bruce in 1312 and went on to become one of the largest and wealthiest religious houses in Scotland.

The most renowned of the Abbots was Robert Reid, who erected several buildings at the abbey, including the library. Upon his death, he donated his estate to found the University of Edinburgh.

Ruins of Kinloss Abbey

The Abbey was not originally part of the Barony, but the first known Crown Charter for the Barony of Muirton was granted to Robert Reid on 16 May 1532. By 1611 both the Abbey lands and the Barony of Muirton were included in the Lordship of Kinloss. A Charter of Novadamus granted to Sir Robert Innes of Muirton in 1632, formed various properties in the Lordship of Kinloss, including the abbey and the land of Muirton, into a larger Barony of Muirton.

After the Reformation in Scotland in 1560 the abbey was abandoned. Much of the stone from the buildings was taken by Cromwell in 1650 to build the Citadel in Inverness. Ruins of some of the buildings still remain and are part of a local cemetery.

=== Burgh of Barony of Findhorn ===
Findhorn "appears to have always been ... a part of the Barony of Muirton". It is one of the oldest seaports on the coast of the Moray Firth and was a trading port for exporting grain and timber to Holland and Flanders and importing wine and merchandise. There was significant salmon fishing at the mouth of the river and herring fishing at sea. In the seventeenth century it was the principal seaport for Moray, but trade to Findhorn declined over the years as the harbour was not able to handle the increasing size of trade vessels.

Findhorn was erected into a burgh of barony in 1661 by act of Parliament. It is located on the east side of the mouth of the Findhorn River. Apparently, the original town was one and a half miles northwest and was cut off and inundated by the sea in 1701, due to the shoreline eroding and shifting. The overwhelming of the adjacent Barony of Culbin by drifting sands happened contemporaneously.

Today the town is a dormitory suburb for Forres? or Inverness? with moorings for leisure craft. Findhorn Ecovillage, near the town, is an intentional community begun in 1962 and then continued as a sustainable development with the formation of the Findhorn Foundation in 1972.

=== RAF Kinloss and Kinloss Barracks ===
In 1938, with the start of World War II, much of the land of the barony was requisitioned (compulsorily purchased) by the government to build a new Royal Air Force base, RAF Kinloss. The airbase opened as a flight training centre in 1939 with three 1000m grass runways. By 1940 Bomber Command had taken over operations and in 1942 the runways were paved, and the main runway extended to 1800m.

After the war, the mission of the base changed to anti-submarine warfare and search and rescue under Coastal Command. In 1997 the UK Aeronautical Rescue Coordination Center was moved to RAF Kinloss and continued there until 2016.

In 2012, control of the base was transferred to the British Army and it became known as Kinloss Barracks. Two regiments of Royal Engineers are currently based at Kinloss Barracks, 39th and 71st (Reserve). It is also home to a receiver station of the Defence High Frequency Communications Service. The airfield is still maintained as a relief field and for temporary deployment of aircraft from RAF Lossiemouth.

=== Town of Muirton ===
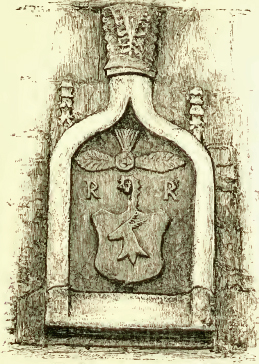
Arms of Abbot Robert Reid

James Calder of Muirton was granted a charter by Charles II in 1674 allowing him to use some of the lands of Muirton to create a burgh of barony of Muirton, with a weekly market on Thursdays and two annual fairs. An Ordnance survey map in 1870 shows a few buildings labeled "Muirtown" at a site that is now the southeast corner of Kinloss Barracks(see below).

=== Town of Kinloss ===
A charter by James IV in 1497 granted the Abbots of Kinloss a burgh of barony for the "town before the gate of the monastery". A market was permitted on Tuesdays and fairs every year at the feast of the Assumption and Candlemas.

The population of the town does not appear to have changed much over the last few centuries, as in 1755 was 1119, in 1841 it was 1202 and the current population is 1420.

The modern town is situated adjacent to Kinloss Barracks.

== Barons ==
=== Robertsons ===
The Barony of Muirton has been associated with several families. The first known Crown Charter was granted in 1532 to the Abbot of Kinloss, Robert Reid. However, John Robertson is noted as the first Baron of Muirton. His eldest son Gilbert was married to Janet Reid, the sister of the Abbot, Robert Reid. This family connection is probably what led to the Abbot enfiefing Robertson as his vassal.

John Robertson, 1st of Muirton, was a younger son of Alexander the fifth Baron of Strowan and married to Margaret Crichton, granddaughter of James II. He was succeeded in the barony by his aforementioned son Gilbert Robertson of Muirton. Gilbert's eldest son, David Robertson, was the third Baron of Muirton, and he was succeeded by his eldest son William Robertson of Muirton.

=== Bruces ===
Mary Queen of Scots stayed at the Abbey of Kinloss in 1562. and sometime after that the church lands were confiscated in the wake of the Reformation. Edward Bruce acquired much of the land and became Commendator in 1601. Edward was the son of Sir Edward Bruce, 1st of Blairhall, and Alison Reid, sister of Robert Reid the Abbot.

He sold the abbey buildings to Alexander Brodie of Lethen but retained the lands and barony of Muirton. Muirton and the remaining lands of the abbey were formed into the Barony of Kinloss. Edward eventually became 1st Baron Bruce of Kinloss, Lord Kinloss and Lord Bruce of Kinloss. He was raised to the dignity of Lord of Session and when James VI ascended to the English throne, Lord Kinloss went with him and became a Privy Councillor and Master of the Rolls in London. In 1611, he was succeeded in his titles and in the "lands, lordship and barony of Kinloss, including the lands of Muirton" by his son Edward Bruce of Kinloss, 2nd Lord Kinloss. This Edward was killed in a duel with Edward Sackville, later Earl of Dorset in 1613. His brother, Thomas Bruce, succeeded him, and eventually became the 1st Earl of Elgin.

=== Mackenzies ===
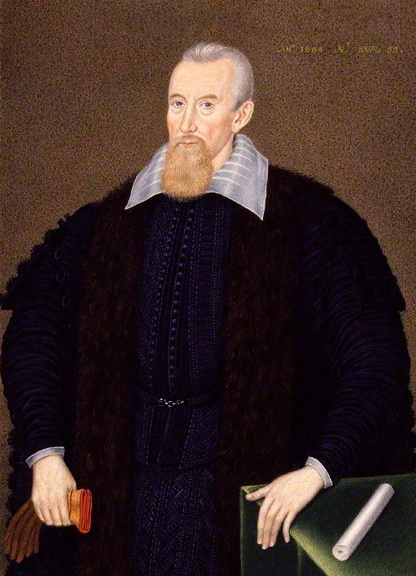
Edward Bruce, Lord Kinloss

At some time during the Wars of the Three Kingdoms the lands of Muirton fell into the hands of the Mackenzies and after several kinsmen held the lands, Alexander Mackenzie was granted a Crown Charter for the lands and Barony of Muirton. He was married to Marie Cuthbert of Drakies. The Cuthberts of Drakies were a cadet branch of the Cuthberts of Castlehill, near Inverness.

=== Innes ===
At the end of the Wars of the Three Kingdoms in 1672 Sir Robert Innes of Muirton was granted a Charter of Novadamus to the Barony of Muirton. He was succeeded by his son, also Robert and then by Sir Robert Calder, Bt., husband of Grisel Innes.

=== Roses ===
During and immediately after the Glorious Revolution in 1688 there was a period of tumult and multiple transitions in the ownership of the barony. By the early 1700s the Roses of Kilravock held the Barony of Muirton, as Hugh Rose, 15th of Kilravock and his wife Beatrix Cuthbert of Castlehill were granted a royal charter in 1712 by Queen Anne. Beatrix was the daughter of John Cuthbert 11th Baron of Castlehill. The Cuthberts were originally a Northumbrian family descended from "the kin of St. Cuthbert" who settled in the area near Inverness in the 13th century. There was a long connection between these families, as the Cuthberts of Castlehill were descended from George Cuthbert, 1st of Castlehill and his wife Marjory (Mary) Rose of Kilravock, daughter of Hugh Rose, third Baron of Kilravock. The Rose family is descended from a Norman family that settled in Nairn in the 1300s and has had their seat at Kilravock since 1460. The Roses of Kilravock have been the Chiefs of Clan Rose since that time. Hugh Rose (1663-1732) was, in addition to being baron of Kilravock and Muirton, Commissioner for the Justiciary, Sherriff of Ross (1706-1722, 1729–1732) and Member of Parliament for Nairn (1725-1732).

Hugh Rose was succeeded by his son, Hugh Rose 16th of Kilravock in 1732 in both the Barony of Kilravock and the Barony of Muirton. The Roses kept a house in Findhorn during this period, but their seat was still at Castle Kilravock. Just before the Battle of Culloden this Hugh Rose hosted both "Bonnie" Prince Charles and the Duke of Cumberland at the castle two days apart, apparently hedging his bet on the outcome of the Jacobite rising of 1745. The Barony of Muirton then continued through a succession of Hugh Roses.

=== Munro Fergusons ===
On 3 November 1817, an Instrument of Sasine (in Latin) was recorded in favor of Hugh Andrew Johnstone Munro for the Barony of Muirton. He was later designed Hugh Andrew Johnstone Munro of Novar and Muirton and was well known as an art collector. Upon his death his lands and titles fell to his cousin, Robert Munro Ferguson of Novar and Muirton. His son, Ronald Crauford Munro Ferguson of Novar and Muirton was granted by Queen Victoria a Crown Charter of Confirmation on 18 July 1870 for the Barony of Muirton.

Munro Ferguson served in the Army in India until 1884 and upon returning to Britain was elected to Parliament. He represented Ross and Cromarty and then Leith Burghs until 1914. Before the outset of WWI he accepted the post of Governor General of Australia, which he held until 1920. He was then elevated to the Peerage as Viscount Novar, of Raith in county Fife and Novar in the county of Ross. Upon returning from Australia, he was named Secretary of State for Scotland. He served in the House of Lords and on the board of directors of several companies. Upon his death in 1934, his lands and estates, including Muirton, were transferred to a family owned company and as noted above, most of the land became RAF Kinloss. The title Viscount Novar ended and the title Baron of Muirton became "dormant".

== Current Baron of Muirton ==
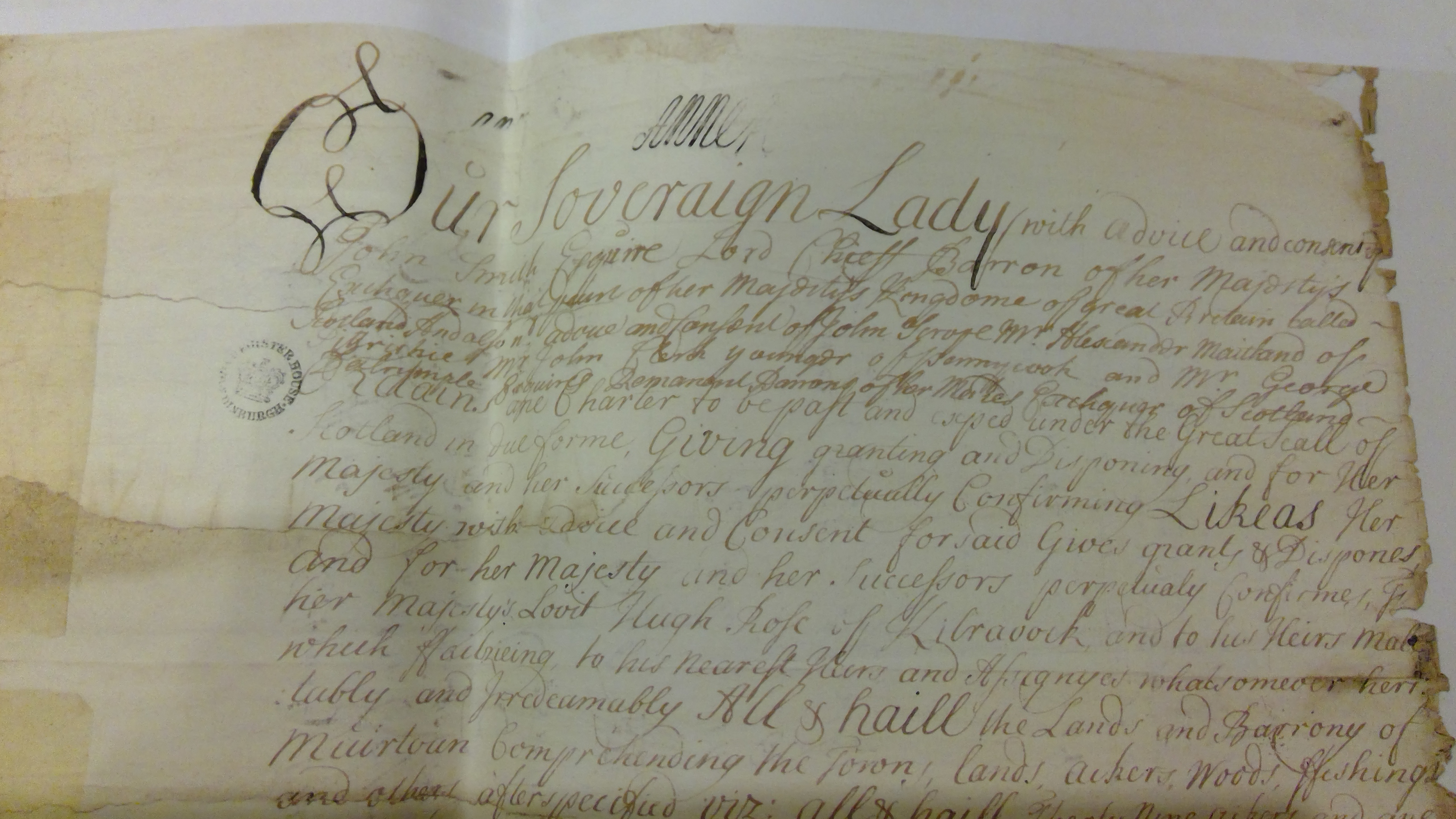
Crown Charter of 1712 signed at the top by Queen Anne

The current holder of the title is the M. Hon. Dr. Richard Bruce Culbert of Muirton, 32nd Baron of Muirton. The title has been held since 2019 by purchase based upon the Crown Charter of 1870. He claims descent from the Bruces, the Cuthberts of Castlehill and the Roses of Kilravock and also connections to the Robertsons and Abbot Robert Reid.

He is married to Lady Kristi Dawn Culbert, Baroness of Muirton, and their children are;

- Miss Cailin Michelle Culbert of Muirton
- Master Jacob William Culbert, Baron (younger) of Muirton

== Muirton in literature ==
The moors near the borders of the barony are reported to be the location of the famous scene involving the "weird sisters" and Macbeth and Banquo in Shakespeare's historic play "Macbeth".

According to "The Chronicle of the Kings of Alba", the body of King Dub (Duff) was hidden under a bridge over the Findhorn river after his murder. After its discovery it was removed to Iona and interred there. It has been suggested that Sueno's Stone, nearby, was erected to depict his victory in battle and subsequent murder
