= 3rd Cavalry Regiment (India) =

Indian Army regiment

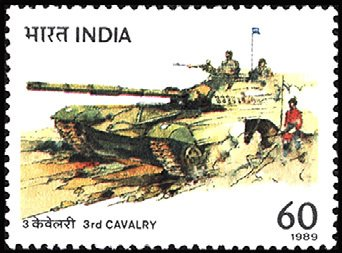
- Active: 1922–present
- Country: British India; India
- Branch: British Indian Army; Indian Army
- Type: Cavalry
- Role: Airborne reconnaissance
- Size: Regiment
- Equipment: T-72
- Engagements: First Afghan War; Second Afghan War; North West Frontier; World War I Mesopotamian campaign World War II; Indo-Pakistani War of 1965; Indo-Pakistani War of 1971
- Battle honours: Afghanistan 1879–80; Mesopotamia 1916–18; North Malaya; Central Malaya; Malaya 1941–42; Punjab 1965; Shahjra; Punjab 1971

Commanders
- Colonel of the Regiment: Lieutenant General Mohit Malhotra
- Notable commanders: Lieutenant General Daulet Singh

Insignia
- Regimental flag

The 3rd Cavalry Regiment is a cavalry regiment of the Indian Army formed from the 5th and 8th Cavalry regiments in 1922.

It served on the North West Frontier and during World War I and World War II, in British Indian service.

== Early history ==
The 3rd Cavalry Regiment was formed from two older regiments, the 7th Irregular Cavalry, which was raised in 1841 at Bareilly, and the 17th Cavalry, which was raised at Sultanpur in 1846. Often re-designated, by the turn of the century they were called 5th Cavalry and 8th Lancers. The two regiments served in India and abroad and saw action in Afghanistan, Bhutan, Mesopotamia and Palestine, earning Battle Honours Afghanistan 1879–80 and Mesopotamia 1916–18. They were amalgamated in 1922, to form the 5th/8th Cavalry, re-designated in 1923 as 3rd Cavalry. They were selected to become an Indianised regiment from 1931 onwards.

=== 5th Cavalry ===
Raised at Bareilly in 1841 as a result of the First Afghan War the regiment also served in the Second Afghan War between 1878 and 1880. Like all the regiments of the Indian Army, the 5th Cavalry underwent many name changes in the various reorganisations. They are listed below:

1841 7th Irregular Cavalry
1861 5th Regiment of Bengal Cavalry
1901 5th Bengal Cavalry
1903 5th Cavalry.

World War I

At the start of World War I the 5th Cavalry was part of the 4th (Rawalpindi) Brigade in October 1916 they transferred to the 1st (Peshawar) Division for service on the North West Frontier until October 1917 when they left to take part in the Mesopotamian campaign .

=== 8th Lancers ===
The 8th Lancers were the last regiment to be raised before the Indian Mutiny. They served in Peshawar in 1857 and in the Second Afghan War. They were issued with lances in 1899 to become the 8th Bengal Lancers. This title was later changed to the 8th Lancers. Like all the regiments of the Indian Army, the 8th Lancers underwent many name changes in various reorganisations:

- 1846: 17th Irregular Cavalry
- 1847: 18th Irregular Cavalry
- 1861: 8th Regiment of Bengal Cavalry
- 1900: 8th Regiment of Bengal Lancers
- 1901: 8th Bengal Lancers
- 1903: 8th Lancers

World War I

During World War I, the 8th Lancers were part of the Jhansi Brigade at Mhow under the command of Major General Townshend. The brigade consisted of the:

- 8th Lancers
- 38th Central Indian Horse
- 2nd Battalion, Royal Berkshire Regiment
- 10th Jats
- 99th Deccan Infantry
- 107th Pioneers
- 116th Mahrattas
- 60th Company, RGA

== World War II ==
In 1941, whilst still in the process of being equipped with armoured cars, 3rd Cavalry was made part of the 11th Indian Infantry Division and was deployed to Malaya to counter the Japanese advance. They were involved in the battles at Taiping, Perak, Sungei Pattani, Penang Island, Perak River and the Battle of Slim River, where two Indian brigades were annihilated by the Japanese. The regiment was then captured by the Japanese after the fall of Singapore and went into captivity until the end of the war. For the regiment's service in Malaya it was awarded the Battle Honours "North Malaya" and "Central Malaya" and Theatre Honour "Malaya 1941–42".

== Post-war ==
Although recommended to be disbanded after the war, the regiment was instead designated a regiment of airborne reconnaissance cavalry in 1946.

Partition of India

During the post partition riots, Sowar Prithi Singh was awarded the Ashoka Chakra, Class II for showing bravery, when a military special train was attacked by a mob.

Hyderabad Police Action (1948)

The Regiment was part of the Smash Force (1 Armoured Brigade) which liberated Hyderabad from marauding Razakars and integrated this princely state with the Union of India.

Indo-Pakistani War of 1965

The Regiment, which was part of the 2nd Independent Armored Brigade under 4 Infantry Division played an important part in the Battle of Asal Uttar. For its crucial role in the battle, the regiment won the Battle Honour "Asal Uttar" and Theatre Honour "Punjab 1965" and earned the sobriquet The Patton Wreckers. Lieutenant Colonel Salim Caleb, the Commandant of the regiment was awarded the Maha Vir Chakra.

Indo-Pakistani War of 1971

The Regiment was part of the 7 Infantry Division under XI Corps and was equipped with Centurion tanks. It was awarded the Battle Honour "Shehjra" and Theatre Honour "Punjab 1971".

== Composition ==
The regiment has a “fixed class” composition, drawing troops from Rajputs, Sikhs and Jats.

== Regimental Insignia ==
The Regimental insignia consists of the Roman numeral 'III' mounted with the Ashoka capital and a scroll below with the word 'Cavalry'.
