= 8th Lancers =

- Active: 1846-1921
- Country: India
- Allegiance: East India Company (1846-1858); British India (1858-1921)
- Branch: Bengal Army (1846-1895); British Indian Army (1895-1921)
- Type: Cavalry
- Size: Regiment
- Engagements: Indian Rebellion of 1857; Second Anglo-Afghan War

The 8th Lancers was a cavalry regiment of the Bengal Army (1846–1895) and the British Indian Army until 1921 when it was amalgamated 5th Cavalry regiment to form the 3rd Cavalry regiment.

== Origin and history ==
The 8th Lancers were the last cavalry regiment to be established before the Indian Rebellion of 1857, being raised by Captain W. H. Ryves at Sultanpore in 1846. The regiment served in Peshawar during 1857 rebellion and served in the Second Anglo-Afghan War. They were issued with lances in 1899 to become the 8th Bengal Lancers, later changed to the 8th Lancers.

As the 8th Cavalry the regiment spent World War I on internal security duties in India although it was sent to Palestine in 1920. On returning to India in 1921 they were amalgamated with the 5th Cavalry and to form the 3rd Cavalry regiment.

== Titles ==
Like all regiments of the British Indian Army, the 8th Lancers underwent many name changes in the various reorganisations. They are listed below.

- 1846 17th Irregular Cavalry
- 1847 18th Irregular Cavalry
- 1861 8th Regiment of Bengal Cavalry
- 1900 8th Regiment of Bengal Lancers
- 1901 8th Bengal Lancers
- 1903 8th Lancers
- 1904 8th Cavalry
- 1922 3rd Cavalry following amalgamation with the 5th Cavalry regiment
