= List of provosts of Inverness =

This is a list of provosts of Inverness.

In 2012, the traditional functions of the Provost were controversially divided by the creation of a new executive role of "leader of the city". On 13 August 2012, Ian Brown was the first person to be appointed to work alongside the provost as leader of the city.

== 16th Century ==
- 1556 – 1559: George Cuthbert of Auld Castlehill
- 1560 – 1561: Jasper Waus of Lochslyne
- 1562 – 1563: John Ross
- 1564 – 1567: James Paterson
- 1568 – 1568: Alexander Baillie
- 1569 – 1569: William Cuthbert
- 1570 – 1572: James Paterson
- 1573 – 1574: William Cuthbert
- 1575 – 1575: John Ross
- 1576 – 1576: James Paterson
- 1577 – 1577: William Cuthbert
- 1578 – 1579: William Baillie of Dunain
- 1580 – 1580: William Cuthbert
- 1581 – 1582: William Baillie of Dunnane
- 1583 – 1583: John Cuthbert of Auld Castlehill
- 1584 – 1584: John Ross
- 1585 – 1586: William Cuthbert

== 17th Century ==
- 1602 – 1603: William Cuthbert
- 1603 – 1606: Master John Ross of Midleys
- 1607 – 1614: John Cuthbert of Auld Castlehill
- 1615 – 1616: John Ross
- 1616 – 1617: John Cuthbert of Auld Castlehill
- 1617 – 1618: Alexander Baillie of Dunzean
- 1618 – 1619: John Ross
- 1620 – 1621: James Cuthbert of Easter Drakies
- 1622 – 1623: James Cuthbert of Lochelin
- 1623 – 1624: John Ross of Midleys
- 1624 – 1625: Alexander Baillie of Dunzean
- 1625 – 1627: Duncan Forbes of Buddit
- 1628 – 1629: James Cuthbert of Easter Draikies
- 1630 – 1630: Andrew Fraser
- 1631 – 1631: James Cuthbert of Draikies
- 1632 – 1632: Duncan Forbes of Bucht
- 1633 – 1633: Duncan Forbes
- 1634 – 1635: John Ross Younger
- 1636 – 1636: James Cuthbert of Draikies
- 1636 – 1638: John Cuthbert, Wester Draikies
- 1638 – 1639: Master John Ross
- 1639 – 1640: James Cuthbert of Easter Draikies
- 1640 – 1643: James Ross of Merkinch
- 1643 – 1645: Duncan Forbes of Culloden
- 1645 – 1646: James Cuthbert of Easter Draikies
- 1646 – 1651: John Forbes, fiar of Culloden
- 1651 – 1652: Robert Ross
- 1652 – 1655: John Forbes
- 1655 – 1655: Robert Ross
- 1655 – 1662: No council records
- 1662 – 1662: Alexander Cuthbert
- 1662 – 1663: Robert Ross
- 1663 – 1666: Alexander Cuthbert
- 1666 – 1668: Alexander Dunbar (elder)
- 1668 – 1674: Alexander Cuthbert
- 1674 – 1679: Alexander Dunbar
- 1679 – 1680: Alexander Cuthbert
- 1680 – 1683: Alexander Dunbar
- 1683 – 1689: John Cuthbert of Draikies
- 1689 – 1692: Hugh Robertson
- 1692 – 1695: William Duff (elder)
- 1695 – 1699: Hugh Robertson
- 1699 – 1701: William Duff (elder)

== 18th Century ==
- 1701 – 1703: Hugh Robertson
- 1703 – 1706: William Duff (elder)
- 1706 – 1709: Alexander Duff of Drumore
- 1709 – 1712: William Duff
- 1712 – 1715: Alexander Duff of Drumore
- 1715 – 1716: Alexander Clark, merchant
- 1716 – 1718: John Forbes of Culloden
- 1718 – 1720: Alexander Fraser
- 1720–1723: John Forbes of Culloden
- 1723–1725: Alexander Fraser
- 1725 – 1728: John Forbes of Culloden
- 1728–1729: Alexander Fraser
- 1729–1732: John Forbes of Culloden
- 1732–1735: Alexander Fraser
- 1735–1738: John Hossack
- 1738–1741: William Maclean of Dochgarroch
- 1741–1744: John Hossack
- 1744–1747: John Fraser
- 1747–1750: William Maclean of Dochgarroch
- 1750–1753: John Fraser
- 1753–1756: John Hossack
- 1756–1758: John Fraser
- 1758–1761: John Hossack
- 1761–1764: William Mackintosh (elder)
- 1764–1767: James Fraser
- 1767–1770: William Mackintosh (elder)
- 1770–1773: Phineas Mackintosh
- 1773–1776: William Chisholm
- 1776–1779: Phineas Mackintosh
- 1779–1782: William Chisholm
- 1782–1785: Phineas Mackintosh
- 1785–1788: William Mackintosh
- 1788–1791: Phineas Mackintosh
- 1791–1794: William Mackintosh
- 1794–1797: John Mackintosh (of the Aberarder family)
- 1797–1800: William Inglis of Kingsmills

== 19th Century ==
- 1800–1803: John Mackintosh (of the Aberarder family)
- 1803–1804: Alexander Mackintosh
- 1804–1807: James Grant
- 1807–1810: Thomas Gilzean
- 1810–1813: James Grant
- 1813–1814: Thomas Gilzean
- 1814–1816: James Grant
- 1816–1818: James Robertson
- 1818–1822: Interim trustees
- 1822–1823: James Robertson
- 1823–1824: James Grant
- 1824–1827: James Robertson
- 1827–1829: James Grant
- 1829–1831: James Robertson
- 1831–1833: John Ross
- 1833–1834: John Mackenzie
- 1834–1836: John Fraser
- 1836–1839: John Ferguson
- 1839–1840: Alexander Cumming
- 1840–1843: John Inglis Nicol
- 1843–1846: James Sutherland
- 1847–1852: William Simpson
- 1852–1855: James Sutherland
- 1855–1867: Colin Lyon Mackenzie
- 1867–1873: John Mackenzie
- 1873–1875: Colin Lyon Mackenzie
- 1875–1880: Alexander Simpson
- 1880 – 1880: William Mackintosh
- 1880–1883: Alexander Fraser
- 1883–1889: Henry Cockburn Macandrew
- 1889–1895: Alexander Ross
- 1895 – 1901: William Macbean

== 20th Century ==
- 1901 – 1907: Arthur Dougal Ross
- 1907 – 1910: James Alexander Gossip
- 1910 – 1916: John Birnie
- 1916 – 1922: Sir Donald Macdonald
- 1922 – 1925: David Petrie
- 1925 – 1931: Alexander MacEwen
- 1931 – 1933: Donald Macdonald (died in office)
- 1933 – 1934: John Mackenzie (died in office)
- 1934 – 1945: Hugh Mackenzie
- 1945 – 1949: Hugh Ross
- 1949 – 1955: James M Grigor
- 1955 – 1961: Robert Wotherspoon
- 1961 – 1964: Allan Ross
- 1964 – 1967: William J Mackay
- 1967 – 1975: William A Smith
- 1975 – 1980: Ian C Fraser
- 1980 – 1992: Allan G Sellar
- 1992 – 1996: William A E Fraser
- 1996 – 1999: Allan G Sellar
- 1999 – 2007: William J Smith

== 21st Century ==
- 2007 – 2008: Robert Wynd
- 2008 – 2012: Jimmy Gray
- 2012 – 2015 Alex Graham
- 2015 – Helen Carmichael
- 2022 - Glynis Campbell-Sinclair, elected on 8 June 2022
