= John Mackenzie (banker) =

Scottish banker

John Mackenzie (13 October 1787 – 28 October 1854) was a Scottish banker and Provost of Inverness.

== Origins ==
Mackenzie was the ninth son of Alexander Mackenzie of Portmore (descended from the Mackenzies of Gairloch) and Anne, the eldest daughter of Colin Mackenzie of Kilcoy.

== Career ==
Mackenzie was for many years a successful agent in Inverness for the Bank of Scotland ( and also Commissioner for the Redcastle and Flowerburn estates. He took a leading part in local Liberal politics and, following the passage of the Municipal Reform (Scotland) Act in 1833, was unanimously elected the first post-reform Provost of Inverness. The Inverness Courier for 25 September 1833 records the presentation to him of a piece of plate, inscribed "by admirers of his public conduct and private character, residing in Inverness and neighbourhood; in acknowledgment of his strenuous and valuable services in support of popular rights during Earl Grey’s administration, a period of the highest importance to the political independence and welfare of the nation, September 1833".

Mackenzie was widely urged to come forward as a candidate for Parliament and was later offered the Governorship of Ceylon and also of Mauritius, but declined to accept any of these invitations.

Mackenzie's overtly political activities did not find favour with his employers and he was instructed to desist or to retire from service. On 19 November 1834, the Inverness Courier recorded that "much regret was expressed that Mr John Mackenzie, banker, found it necessary to resign the office of Provost of Inverness on account of ill-health".

Mackenzie died on 28 October 1854.

== Character ==
A flattering retrospective portrait of Mackenzie was painted by Isabel Anderson:

"In those days, when everyone was more or less hospitable, and the set of fine-looking courtly bankers, for whom Inverness was at that time noted, vied with each other in keeping open house, there was no one who dispensed hospitality with a more lavish hand, no one who was more generous to all who needed help, than Mr Mackenzie, Ness House, agent for the Bank of Scotland. Not only did his birth and connections, his singularly aristocratic appearance and exquisite courtesy secure for him the undoubted precedence, but he was about the last to maintain in Inverness the manners and customs of a former generation, and was even in those days considered the beau ideal of a Highland gentleman of the olden time."

== Family ==
Mackenzie married (on 4 December 1817) Mary Charlotte, the only child of Robert Pierson, a merchant of Riga. They had at least seven children. Their grandchildren included (by their third son, Colin) Major-General Sir Colin Mackenzie.
