= Henry Cockburn Macandrew =

Scottish solicitor and provost of Inverness

Sir Henry Cockburn Macandrew VD JP FSAScot
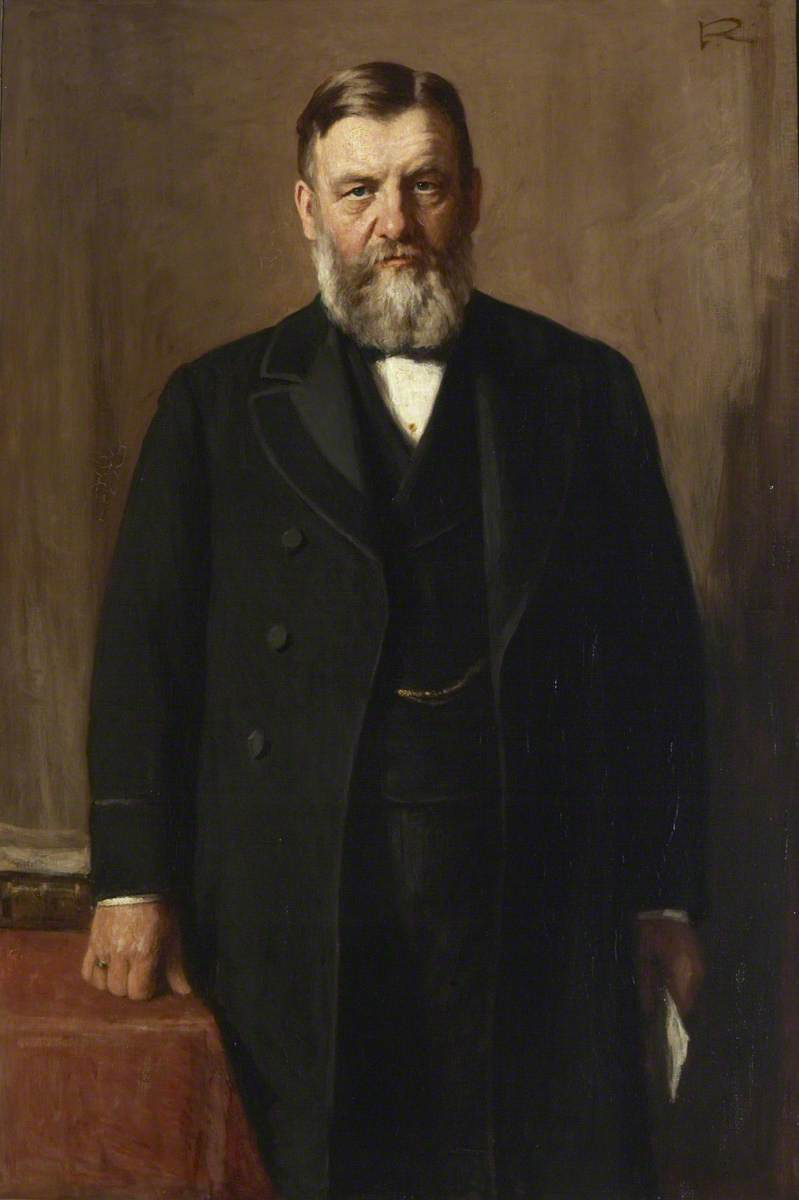
- Portrait of Macandrew by Sir George Reid c.1892

Provost of Inverness
- In office 1883–1889

Personal details
- Born: 8 May 1832 Inverness, Scotland
- Died: 26 September 1898 (aged 66) Balmacara, Scotland
- Occupation: Solicitor

Military service
- Allegiance: United Kingdom
- Branch/service: British Army
- Years of service: 1859–1884
- Rank: Lieutenant-Colonel
- Unit: 1st Inverness Rifle Volunteer Corps

Lieutenant-Colonel Sir Henry Cockburn Macandrew VD JP FSAScot (8 May 1832 – 26 September 1898) was a Scottish solicitor and Inverness functionary. Macandrew worked throughout his life as a solicitor in Inverness, also serving in the British Army as part of the Volunteer Force, reaching the rank of lieutenant-colonel after twenty-five years of service. From 1883 to 1889 Macandrew was the provost of Inverness, for which service he was knighted by Queen Victoria in 1887. His children included Major-General Sir Henry Macandrew.

== Early life ==
Henry Cockburn Macandrew was born in Inverness on 8 May 1832. He was one of nine children of John Macandrew, a solicitor. Through his mother, who is not named in sources, Macandrew was related to the Macphersons of Ardersier, including Lieutenant-General Sir Herbert Macpherson who was a cousin of his.

Having been educated at Inverness Royal Academy and the University of Aberdeen, Macandrew initially intended to become part of the Free Church of Scotland but instead joined his father's legal office in Inverness where he received legal training.

== Legal and military career ==
After leaving his father's legal practice in 1851 Macandrew joined the Bank of England, working there until 1854 when he returned to Inverness. He was admitted as a procurator there on 25 October 1855, and in the same year joined with solicitor James Macpherson, who had been a partner of Macandrew's father, to create the firm of Macpherson and Macandrew; upon the former's death in 1868 Macandrew practiced as an independent solicitor for ten years before in 1878 he partnered with Macpherson's nephew R. P. Jenkins to create Macandrew and Jenkins. This firm went on to become one of the largest law firms in the north of Scotland.

Alongside his private solicitor work, Macandrew also worked as the agent of the member of parliament Sir Alexander Matheson and in 1879 was also appointed as the Inverness agent for the Royal Bank of Scotland, which role he continued in for the rest of his life.

Macandrew also served in the British Army's Volunteer Force from its creation in 1859. Part of the 1st Inverness Rifle Volunteer Corps and serving as an ensign, Macandrew was promoted to lieutenant in around April 1864 and on 25 November 1868 was subsequently advanced to captain. Macandrew was promoted to become one of two majors in the now-renamed Administrative Battalion of Inverness-shire Highland Rifle Volunteers on 4 September 1875. He retired from the army in 1884, and as such on 18 November that year was advanced to the rank of lieutenant-colonel to become the honorary colonel of the battalion. He received the Volunteer Officers' Decoration for twenty years of service in the Volunteer Force.

== Public office ==
Macandrew was appointed as sheriff-clerk of Invernessshire in 1870, and in 1882 was elected to serve on Inverness Town Council. In the same year he was also elected a Fellow of the Society of Antiquaries of Scotland, having published several papers on the ecclesiastical history of Scotland and Ireland. Macandrew then became head of Inverness Town Council as provost of Inverness in 1883. Macandrew was the first person in Inverness to make a telephone call when in 1885 he phoned Craigmonie House, which was numbered Inverness 2, from Inverness Town House, Inverness 1.

Macandrew was re-elected for a second term as provost in 1886 and in late 1887 travelled to Osborne House on the Isle of Wight, where on 29 December he was knighted by Queen Victoria as part of the celebrations around the monarch's Golden Jubilee. The knighthood was given in recognition of his public services to the north of Scotland and Inverness.

Macandrew continued on as provost until 1889 when he retired to concentrate on his increasingly busy law practice. Macandrew, who also served as a justice of the peace, was on a holiday when he died in the Balmacara Hotel, Balmacara, on 26 September 1898. The Pall Mall Gazette suggested that at the time of his death he was the most prominent citizen of Inverness.

== Personal life ==
Macandrew married Mary Rait, daughter of David Crichton Rait of Glasgow, on 28 August 1862. The service at St John's Episcopal Church, Glasgow, was conducted by William Wilson. Together the couple lived at Aisthorpe, and had one son and three daughters, including:

- Major-General Sir Henry John Milnes Macandrew (7 August 1866 – 16 July 1919), British Indian Army cavalry officer.
- Edith Margaret Catherine Colquhoun Macandrew (b. before 1873), married Major Granville Cholmondeley Feilden in 1894.
- Fanny Macandrew (b. before 1873)
