= Baron of Castlehill =

Title of nobility in the Baronage of Scotland

Baron of Castlehill is a title of nobility in the Baronage of Scotland in Inverness. It is entirely distinct from the Barony of Castlehill located in the parish of Lesmahagow, Lanarkshire.

Castlehill, also called as Auld Castlehill, lies on the outskirts of the burgh of Inverness, between Culcabock, Drakies, and Culloden and it may be the hill where Macbeth's castle once stood. The lands were thought to have been granted to the Cuthbert family by King Kenneth I in the 950s, however the first known charter erecting Castlehill into a barony is from King James III on 23 July 1478. This charter was granted to William Cuthbert, grandson of George Cuthbert "who distinguished himself at the Battle of Harlaw".

The barony was held by the Cuthbert family until 1802. When Lewis Cuthbert died in that year, the lands were sold and the title of baron became "dormant".

== List of Barons of Castlehill ==
The following is a list of Barons.

- George Cuthbert, 1st Baron of Castlehill (born 1360, date of death unknown), he is counted as the first Baron because he is referred to in the royal charter of 1478 as having been granted the barony after the Battle of Harlaw in 1411.
- John Cuthbert, 2nd Baron of Castlehill (born 1390, date of death unknown)
- William Cuthbert, 3rd Baron of Castlehill (born 1420, date of death unknown)
- Cuthbert, 4th Baron of Castlehill (born 1450, date of death unknown)
- John Cuthbert, 5th Baron of Castlehill, sheriff deputy of Inverness (1475–1548)
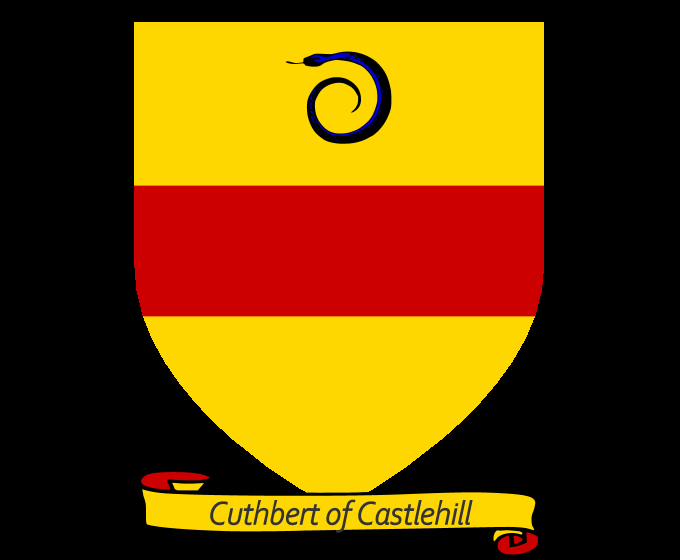
  Arms of George Cuthbert 1st of Castlehill
- George Cuthbert, 6th Baron of Castlehill, provost and sheriff deputy of Inverness (1510–1592)
- John Cuthbert, 7th Baron of Castlehill, Provost of Inverness (1540–1624)
- William Johnson Cuthbert, 8th Baron of Castlehill, provost, Baillie and sheriff deputy of Inverness (1570–1625)
- John Cuthbert, 9th Baron of Castlehill (1600–1677)
- George Cuthbert, 10th Baron of Castlehill (1635 – after 1724)
- John Cuthbert, 11th Baron of Castlehill (born 1668)
- George Cuthbert, 12th Baron of Castlehill, sheriff deputy of Inverness (1700–1748)
- Abbé Alexander (Cuthbert) Colbert, 13th Baron of Castlehill, Abbot of Gallican Church (1708–1782)
- Joseph Cuthbert, 14th Baron of Castlehill (1760–1783)
- George Cuthbert, 15th Baron of Castlehill, provost marshal of Jamaica (1748–1789)
- Lewis Cuthbert, 16th Baron of Castlehill, provost marshal of Jamaica (1737–1802)
