= Simply UK =

Care home company based in Scotland

Simply UK is a Scottish investment and real estate development organisation headquartered in Bellshill, with a primary focus on healthcare development and investment throughout the United Kingdom.

== Sector expansion and projects ==
The company's commercial strategy is heavily focused on premium healthcare facilities. Its investment portfolio includes several care providers, including Morar Care Group, Portland Care Group (Complex Care), and Hampton Care Group.

A number of major trade and business publications have covered Simply UK's activities, with particular attention given to its commercial development pipeline, multi-million-pound land acquisitions and financing arrangements, and healthcare design strategies and awards.

== Livingston F.C. ==
Simply UK served as the principal corporate sponsor of Livingston Football Club during the 2024–25 and 2025–26 seasons.
