= 5th Cavalry (India) =

- Active: 1841-1921
- Country: India
- Allegiance: East India Company (1841-1858); British India (1858-1921)
- Branch: Bengal Army (1841-1895); British Indian Army (1895-1921)
- Type: Cavalry
- Size: Regiment

The 5th Cavalry was a cavalry regiment of the Bengal Army (1841–1895) and the British Indian Army (1895–1921) until it was amalgamated with the 8th Lancers to form the 3rd Cavalry.

== History ==
The regiment was raised at Bareilly as the 7th Irregular Cavalry in 1841 as a result of the First Anglo-Afghan War. In 1861 it was renamed the 5th Regiment of Bengal Cavalry. The pre-Indian Rebellion of 1857 Bengal Light Cavalry regiments had been lost to mutiny or disbandment, leaving the number free.

In 1901 the unit was renamed to 5th Bengal Cavalry. The 1903 British Indian Army#Kitchener reforms unified the various Presidency armies, renumbering the regiments into a more cohesive sequence. The Bengal regiments took the first 19 numbers, and so the 5th Bengal Cavalry was simply renamed the 5th Cavalry.

In 1914 the 5th Cavalry was part of the 4th (Rawalpindi) Brigade until October 1916 when they transferred to the 1st (Peshawar) Division for service on the North West Frontier of India. In October 1917 they left to take part in the Mesopotamian campaign.

In 1921, the regiment was amalgamated with the 8th Lancers to form the 3rd Cavalry.

== Colonels of the Regiment ==
5th Cavalry

- 1904–1912: Gen. Sir Charles Gough
- 1919: Maj-Gen. Sir Henry Macandrew
